= List of Fabales of South Africa =

Flowering plants in the order Fabales recorded from South Africa

The Fabales are an order of flowering plants included in the rosid group of the eudicots in the Angiosperm Phylogeny Group II classification system. In the APG II circumscription, this order includes the families Fabaceae or legumes (including the subfamilies Caesalpinioideae, Mimosoideae, and Faboideae), Quillajaceae, Polygalaceae or milkworts (including the families Diclidantheraceae, Moutabeaceae, and Xanthophyllaceae), and Surianaceae. The Fabaceae, as the third-largest plant family in the world, contain most of the diversity of the Fabales, the other families making up a comparatively small portion of the order's diversity. Research in the order is largely focused on the Fabaceae, due in part to its great biological diversity, and to its importance as food plants. The Polygalaceae are fairly well researched among plant families, in part due to the large diversity of the genus Polygala, and other members of the family being food plants for various Lepidoptera (butterfly and moth) species.

The anthophytes are a grouping of plant taxa bearing flower-like reproductive structures. They were formerly thought to be a clade comprising plants bearing flower-like structures. The group contained the angiosperms - the extant flowering plants, such as roses and grasses - as well as the Gnetales and the extinct Bennettitales.

23,420 species of vascular plant have been recorded in South Africa, making it the sixth most species-rich country in the world and the most species-rich country on the African continent. Of these, 153 species are considered to be threatened. Nine biomes have been described in South Africa: Fynbos, Succulent Karoo, desert, Nama Karoo, grassland, savanna, Albany thickets, the Indian Ocean coastal belt, and forests.

The 2018 South African National Biodiversity Institute's National Biodiversity Assessment plant checklist lists 35,130 taxa in the phyla Anthocerotophyta (hornworts (6)), Anthophyta (flowering plants (33534)), Bryophyta (mosses (685)), Cycadophyta (cycads (42)), Lycopodiophyta (Lycophytes(45)), Marchantiophyta (liverworts (376)), Pinophyta (conifers (33)), and Pteridophyta (cryptogams (408)).

Two families are represented in the literature. Listed taxa include species, subspecies, varieties, and forms as recorded, some of which have subsequently been allocated to other taxa as synonyms, in which cases the accepted taxon is appended to the listing. Multiple entries under alternative names reflect taxonomic revision over time.

== Fabaceae ==
Family: Fabaceae,

=== Abrus ===
Genus Abrus:

- Abrus laevigatus E.Mey. indigenous
- Abrus precatorius L. indigenous
- Abrus precatorius L. subsp. africanus Verdc. indigenous

=== Acacia ===
Genus Acacia:

- Acacia adunca A.Cunn. ex G.Don, not indigenous, naturalised
- Acacia afra (Thunb.) Willd. accepted as Senegalia afra (Thunb.) P.J.H.Hurter & Mabb. indigenous
- Acacia arenaria Schinz, accepted as Vachellia arenaria (Schinz) Kyal. & Boatwr.
- Acacia armata R.Br. accepted as Acacia paradoxa DC. not indigenous, naturalised
- Acacia ataxacantha DC. accepted as Senegalia ataxacantha (DC.) Kyal. & Boatwr. indigenous
- Acacia baileyana F.Muell. not indigenous, naturalised, invasive
- Acacia borleae Burtt Davy, accepted as Vachellia borleae (Burtt Davy) Kyal. & Boatwr. indigenous
- Acacia brevispica Harms, accepted as Senegalia brevispica (Harms) Seigler & Ebinger, indigenous
  - Acacia brevispica Harms subsp. dregeana (Benth.) Brenan, accepted as Senegalia brevispica (Harms) Seigler & Ebinger subsp. dregeana (Benth.) Kyal. & Boatwr. indigenous
- Acacia burkei Benth. accepted as Senegalia burkei (Benth.) Kyal. & Boatwr. indigenous
- Acacia crassiuscula H.L.Wendl. not indigenous, naturalised
- Acacia cultriformis A.Cunn. ex G.Don, not indigenous, naturalised
- Acacia cyclops A.Cunn. ex G.Don, not indigenous, naturalised, invasive
- Acacia davyi N.E.Br. accepted as Vachellia davyi (N.E.Br.) Kyal. & Boatwr. indigenous
- Acacia dealbata Link, not indigenous, naturalised, invasive
- Acacia decurrens Willd. not indigenous, naturalised, invasive
- Acacia dyeri P.P.Sw. accepted as Vachellia dyeri (P.P.Sw.) Kyal. & Boatwr. endemic
- Acacia ebutsiniorum P.J.H.Hurter, accepted as Vachellia ebutsiniorum (P.J.H.Hurter) Kyal. & Boatwr. present
- Acacia elata A.Cunn. ex Benth. not indigenous, naturalised, invasive
- Acacia erioloba E.Mey. accepted as Vachellia erioloba (E.Mey.) P.J.H.Hurter, indigenous
- Acacia erubescens Welw. ex Oliv. accepted as Senegalia erubescens (Welw. ex Oliv.) Kyal. & Boatwr. indigenous
- Acacia exuvialis I.Verd. accepted as Vachellia exuvialis (I.Verd.) Kyal. & Boatwr. indigenous
- Acacia farnesiana (L.) Willd. accepted as Vachellia farnesiana (L.) Wight & Arn. not indigenous, naturalised
- Acacia ferox Benth. accepted as Senegalia burkei (Benth.) Kyal. & Boatwr. indigenous
- Acacia fimbriata A.Cunn. ex G.Don, not indigenous, naturalised, invasive
- Acacia fleckii Schinz, indigenous
- Acacia galpinii Burtt Davy, accepted as Senegalia galpinii (Burtt Davy) Seigler & Ebinger, indigenous
- Acacia gerrardi Benth. accepted as Vachellia gerrardi (Benth.) P.J.H.Hurter, indigenous
- Acacia goetzei Harms subsp. microphylla Brenan, accepted as Senegalia goetzei (Harms) Kyal. & Boatwr. subsp. microphylla (Brenan) Kyal. & Boatwr.
- Acacia grandicornuta Gerstner, accepted as Vachellia grandicornuta (Gerstner) Seigler & Ebinger, indigenous
- Acacia haematoxylon Willd. accepted as Vachellia haematoxylon (Willd.) Seigler & Ebinger, indigenous
- Acacia hebeclada DC. subsp. chobiensis (O.B.Mill.) A.Schreib. accepted as Vachellia hebeclada (DC.) Kyal. & Boatwr. subsp. chobiensis (O.B.Mill.) Kyal. & Boatwr.
- Acacia hebeclada DC. subsp. tristis (Welw. ex Oliv.) A.Schreib. accepted as Vachellia hebeclada (DC.) Kyal. & Boatwr. subsp. tristis (A.Schreib.) Kyal. & Boatwr.
- Acacia hereroensis Engl. accepted as Senegalia hereroensis (Engl.) Kyal. & Boatwr. indigenous
- Acacia implexa Benth. not indigenous, naturalised, invasive
- Acacia karroo Hayne, accepted as Vachellia karroo (Hayne) Banfi & Gallaso, indigenous
- Acacia kosiensis P.P.Sw. accepted as Vachellia kosiensis (P.P.Sw. & Coates Palgr.) Kyal. & Boatwr. present
- Acacia kraussiana Meisn. ex Benth. accepted as Senegalia kraussiana (Meisn. ex Benth.) Kyal. & Boatwr. indigenous
- Acacia longifolia (Andrews) Willd. not indigenous, naturalised, invasive
- Acacia luederitzii Engl. accepted as Vachellia luederitzii (Engl.) Kyal. & Boatwr. indigenous
  - Acacia luederitzii Engl. var. retinens (Sim) J.H.Ross & Brenan, accepted as Vachellia luederitzii (Engl.) Kyal. & Boatwr. var. retinens (Sim) & Kyal. & Boatwr. indigenous
- Acacia mearnsii De Wild. not indigenous, naturalised, invasive
- Acacia melanoxylon R.Br. not indigenous, naturalised, invasive
- Acacia mellifera (Vahl) Benth. subsp. detinens (Burch.) Brenan, accepted as Senegalia mellifera (Vahl) Seigler & Ebinger subsp. detinens (Burch.) Kyal. & Boatwr. indigenous
- Acacia montana P.P.Sw. accepted as Acacia theronii P.P.Sw. present
- Acacia montis-usti Merxm. & A.Schreib. accepted as Senegalia montis-usti (Merxm. & A.Schreib.) Kyal. & Boatwr.
- Acacia natalitia E.Mey. accepted as Vachellia natalitia (E.Mey.) Kyal. & Boatwr. endemic
- Acacia nebrownii Burtt Davy, accepted as Vachellia nebrownii (Burtt Davy) Seigler & Ebinger, indigenous
- Acacia nigrescens Oliv. accepted as Senegalia nigrescens (Oliv.) P.J.H.Hurter, indigenous
- Acacia nilotica (L.) Willd. ex Delile subsp. kraussiana (Benth.) Brenan, accepted as Vachellia nilotica (L.) P.J.H.Hurter & Mabb. subsp. kraussiana (Benth.) Kyal. & Boatwr. indigenous
- Acacia ormocarpoides P.J.H.Hurter, accepted as Vachellia ormocarpoides (P.J.H.Hurter) Kyal. & Boatwr. present
- Acacia paradoxa DC. not indigenous, naturalised, invasive
- Acacia permixta Burtt Davy, accepted as Vachellia permixta (Burtt Davy) Kyal. & Boatwr. indigenous
- Acacia podalyriifolia A.Cunn. ex G.Don, not indigenous, naturalised, invasive
- Acacia polyacantha Willd. subsp. campylacantha (Hochst. ex A.Rich.) Brenan, accepted as Senegalia polyacantha (Willd.) Seigler & Ebinger subsp. campylacantha (Hochst. ex A.Rich.) Kyal. & B, indigenous
- Acacia pycnantha Benth. not indigenous, naturalised, invasive
- Acacia rehmanniana Schinz, accepted as Vachellia rehmanniana (Schinz) Kyal. & Boatwr. indigenous
- Acacia retinodes Schltdl. not indigenous, cultivated, naturalised
- Acacia robbertsii P.P.Sw. accepted as Vachellia robbertsei (P.P.Sw.) Kyal. & Boatwr. present
- Acacia robusta Burch. subsp. clavigera (E.Mey.) Brenan, accepted as Vachellia robusta (Burch.) Kyal. & Boatwr. subsp. clavigera (E.Mey.) & Kyal. & Boatwr. indigenous
- Acacia saligna (Labill.) H.L.Wendl. not indigenous, naturalised, invasive
- Acacia schlechteri Harms, accepted as Senegalia burkei (Benth.) Kyal. & Boatwr.
- Acacia sekhukhuniensis P.J.H.Hurter, accepted as Vachellia sekhukhuniensis (P.J.H.Hurter) Kyal. & Boatwr. endemic
- Acacia senegal (L.) Willd. var. leiorhachis Brenan, accepted as Senegalia senegal (L.) Britton var. leiorhachis (Brenan) Kyal. & Boatwr. indigenous
- Acacia senegal (L.) Willd. var. rostrata Brenan, accepted as Senegalia senegal (L.) Britton var. rostrata (Brenan) Kyal. & Boatwr. indigenous
- Acacia sieberiana DC. var. woodii (Burtt Davy) Keay & Brenan, accepted as Vachellia sieberiana (DC.) Kyal. & Boatwr. var. woodii (Burtt Davy) Kyal. & Boatwr. indigenous
- Acacia stricta (Andrews) Willd. not indigenous, naturalised, invasive
- Acacia stuhlmannii Taub. accepted as Vachellia stuhlmannii (Taub.) Kyal. & Boatwr. indigenous
- Acacia swazica Burtt Davy, accepted as Vachellia swazica (Burtt Davy) Kyal. & Boatwr. indigenous
- Acacia tenuispina I.Verd. accepted as Vachellia tenuispina (I.Verd.) Kyal. & Boatwr. indigenous
- Acacia theronii P.P.Sw. endemic
- Acacia tortilis (Forssk.) Hayne subsp. heteracantha (Burch.) Brenan, accepted as Vachellia tortilis (Forssk.) Gallaso & Banfi subsp. heteracantha (Burch.) Kyal. & Boatwr. present
  - Acacia tortilis (Forssk.) Hayne subsp. spirocarpa (Hochst. ex A.Rich.) Brenan var. spirocarpa, accepted as Vachellia tortilis (Forssk.) Gallaso & Banfi subsp. spirocarpa (Hochst. ex A.Rich.) Kyal. & Boatwr.
- Acacia viscidula A.Cunn. ex Benth. not indigenous, cultivated, naturalised, invasive
- Acacia welwitschii Oliv. subsp. delagoensis (Harms) J.H.Ross & Brenan, accepted as Senegalia welwitschii (Oliv.) Kyal. & Boatwr. subsp. delagoensis (Harms ex Burtt Davy) Kyal. & Boatw, indigenous
- Acacia xanthophloea Benth. accepted as Vachellia xanthophloea (Benth.) P.J.H.Hurter, indigenous

=== Acrocarpus ===
Genus Acrocarpus:

- Acrocarpus fraxinifolius Arn. not indigenous, cultivated, naturalised

=== Adenolobus ===
Genus Adenolobus:

- Adenolobus garipensis (E.Mey.) Torre & Hillc. indigenous

=== Adenopodia ===
Genus Adenopodia:

- Adenopodia spicata (E.Mey.) C.Presl, indigenous

=== Aeschynomene ===
Genus Aeschynomene:

- Aeschynomene indica L. indigenous
- Aeschynomene micrantha DC. indigenous
- Aeschynomene nodulosa (Baker) Baker f. indigenous
- Aeschynomene nodulosa (Baker) Baker f. var. glabrescens J.B.Gillett, indigenous
- Aeschynomene nodulosa (Baker) Baker f. var. nodulosa, indigenous
- Aeschynomene nyassana Taub. indigenous
- Aeschynomene rehmannii Schinz, indigenous
  - Aeschynomene rehmannii Schinz var. leptobotrya (Harms ex Baker f.) J.B.Gillett, indigenous
  - Aeschynomene rehmannii Schinz var. rehmannii, indigenous
- Aeschynomene rhodesiaca Harms, indigenous
- Aeschynomene uniflora E.Mey. indigenous
  - Aeschynomene uniflora E.Mey. var. uniflora, indigenous

=== Afzelia ===
Genus Afzelia:

- Afzelia quanzensis Welw. indigenous

=== Albizia ===
Genus Albizia:

- Albizia adianthifolia (Schumach.) W.Wight, indigenous
  - Albizia adianthifolia (Schumach.) W.Wight var. adianthifolia, indigenous
- Albizia amara (Roxb.) Boivin subsp. sericocephala (Benth.) Brenan, indigenous
- Albizia anthelmintica (A.Rich.) Brongn. indigenous
- Albizia antunesiana Harms, indigenous
- Albizia brevifolia Schinz, indigenous
- Albizia forbesii Benth. indigenous
- Albizia harveyi E.Fourn. indigenous
- Albizia julibrissin (Willd.) Durazz. not indigenous, naturalised
- Albizia lebbeck (L.) Benth. not indigenous, naturalised, invasive
- Albizia petersiana (Bolle) Oliv. indigenous
  - Albizia petersiana (Bolle) Oliv. subsp. evansii (Burtt Davy) Brenan, indigenous
- Albizia procera (Roxb.) Benth. not indigenous, naturalised, invasive
- Albizia suluensis Gerstner, endemic
- Albizia tanganyicensis Baker f. indigenous
  - Albizia tanganyicensis Baker f. subsp. tanganyicensis, indigenous
- Albizia versicolor Welw. ex Oliv. indigenous

=== Alhagi ===
Genus Alhagi:

- Alhagi maurorum Medik. not indigenous, naturalised, invasive

=== Alistilus ===
Genus Alistilus:

- Alistilus bechuanicus N.E.Br. indigenous

=== Alysicarpus ===
Genus Alysicarpus:

- Alysicarpus glumaceus (Vahl) DC. subsp. glumaceus var. glumaceus, indigenous
- Alysicarpus rugosus (Willd.) DC. indigenous
  - Alysicarpus rugosus (Willd.) DC. subsp. perennirufus J.Leonard, indigenous
  - Alysicarpus rugosus (Willd.) DC. subsp. rugosus, indigenous
- Alysicarpus vaginalis (L.) DC. indigenous
  - Alysicarpus vaginalis (L.) DC. var. vaginalis, indigenous
- Alysicarpus zeyheri Harv. indigenous

=== Amphinomia ===
Genus Amphinomia:

- Amphinomia furcata Merxm. & A.Schreib. accepted as Leobordea furcata (Merxm. & A.Schreib.) L.A.Silva & J.Freitas, indigenous

=== Amphithalea ===
Genus Amphithalea:

- Amphithalea alba Granby, endemic
- Amphithalea axillaris Granby, endemic
- Amphithalea biovulata (Bolus) Granby, endemic
- Amphithalea bodkinii Dummer, endemic
- Amphithalea bowiei (Benth.) A.L.Schutte, endemic
- Amphithalea bullata (Benth.) A.L.Schutte, endemic
- Amphithalea cedarbergensis (Granby) A.L.Schutte, endemic
- Amphithalea ciliaris Eckl. & Zeyh. endemic
- Amphithalea concava Granby, endemic
- Amphithalea cuneifolia Eckl. & Zeyh. endemic
- Amphithalea cymbifolia (C.A.Sm.) A.L.Schutte, endemic
- Amphithalea dahlgrenii (Granby) A.L.Schutte, endemic
- Amphithalea ericifolia (L.) Eckl. & Zeyh. indigenous
  - Amphithalea ericifolia (L.) Eckl. & Zeyh. subsp. erecta Granby, endemic
  - Amphithalea ericifolia (L.) Eckl. & Zeyh. subsp. ericifolia, endemic
  - Amphithalea ericifolia (L.) Eckl. & Zeyh. subsp. minuta Granby, endemic
  - Amphithalea ericifolia (L.) Eckl. & Zeyh. subsp. scoparia Granby, endemic
- Amphithalea esterhuyseniae (Granby) A.L.Schutte, endemic
- Amphithalea flava (Granby) A.L.Schutte, endemic
- Amphithalea fourcadei Compton, endemic
- Amphithalea imbricata (L.) Druce, endemic
- Amphithalea intermedia Eckl. & Zeyh. endemic
- Amphithalea micrantha Walp. endemic
- Amphithalea minima (Granby) A.L.Schutte, endemic
- Amphithalea monticola A.L.Schutte, endemic
- Amphithalea muirii (Granby) A.L.Schutte, endemic
- Amphithalea muraltioides (Benth.) A.L.Schutte, endemic
- Amphithalea obtusiloba (Granby) A.L.Schutte, endemic
- Amphithalea oppositifolia L.Bolus, endemic
- Amphithalea ornata Boatwr. & J.C.Manning, endemic
- Amphithalea pageae (L.Bolus) A.L.Schutte, endemic
- Amphithalea parvifolia (Thunb.) A.L.Schutte, endemic
- Amphithalea perplexa Eckl. & Zeyh. endemic
- Amphithalea phylicoides Eckl. & Zeyh. endemic
- Amphithalea purpurea (Granby) A.L.Schutte, endemic
- Amphithalea rostrata A.L.Schutte & B.-E.van Wyk, endemic
- Amphithalea sericea Schltr. endemic
- Amphithalea speciosa Schltr. endemic
- Amphithalea spinosa (Harv.) A.L.Schutte, endemic
- Amphithalea stokoei L.Bolus, endemic
- Amphithalea tomentosa (Thunb.) Granby, endemic
- Amphithalea tortilis (E.Mey.) Steud. endemic
- Amphithalea villosa Schltr. endemic
  - Amphithalea villosa Schltr. var. brevifolia Schltr. accepted as Amphithalea muraltioides (Benth.) A.L.Schutte, present
- Amphithalea violacea (E.Mey.) Benth. endemic
- Amphithalea virgata Eckl. & Zeyh. endemic
- Amphithalea vlokii (A.L.Schutte & B.-E.van Wyk) A.L.Schutte, endemic
- Amphithalea williamsonii Harv. endemic

=== Arachis ===
Genus Arachis:

- Arachis hypogaea L. not indigenous, naturalised

=== Argyrolobium ===
Genus Argyrolobium:

- Argyrolobium aciculare Dummer, endemic
- Argyrolobium adscendens (E.Mey.) Walp. ex Harms, indigenous
- Argyrolobium amplexicaule (E.Mey.) Dummer, endemic
- Argyrolobium andrewsianum (E.Mey.) Steud. var. helvolum Harv. accepted as Argyrolobium tomentosum (Andrews) Druce, present
- Argyrolobium angustifolium Eckl. & Zeyh. accepted as Argyrolobium tuberosum Eckl. & Zeyh. present
- Argyrolobium angustissimum (E.Mey.) T.J.Edwards, endemic
- Argyrolobium argenteum Eckl. & Zeyh. endemic
- Argyrolobium ascendens (E.Mey.) Walp. ex Harms, indigenous
- Argyrolobium baptisioides (E.Mey.) Walp. endemic
- Argyrolobium barbatum Walp. endemic
- Argyrolobium biflorum Eckl. & Zeyh. accepted as Argyrolobium pauciflorum Eckl. & Zeyh. present
- Argyrolobium campicola Harms, endemic
- Argyrolobium candicans Eckl. & Zeyh. indigenous
- Argyrolobium collinum Eckl. & Zeyh. indigenous
  - Argyrolobium collinum Eckl. & Zeyh. var. angustatum Harv. accepted as Argyrolobium argenteum Eckl. & Zeyh. present
  - Argyrolobium collinum Eckl. & Zeyh. var. seminudum Harv. accepted as Argyrolobium argenteum Eckl. & Zeyh. present
- Argyrolobium crassifolium Eckl. & Zeyh. endemic
- Argyrolobium crinitum (E.Mey.) Walp. endemic
- Argyrolobium filiforme (Thunb.) Eckl. & Zeyh. endemic
- Argyrolobium frutescens Burtt Davy, indigenous
- Argyrolobium glaucum Schinz, accepted as Argyrolobium tuberosum Eckl. & Zeyh. present
- Argyrolobium harmsianum Schltr. ex Harms, endemic
- Argyrolobium harveyanum Oliv. indigenous
- Argyrolobium hirsuticaule Harms, accepted as Argyrolobium lotoides Harv. present
- Argyrolobium humile E.Phillips, endemic
- Argyrolobium incanum Eckl. & Zeyh. endemic
- Argyrolobium lanceolatum (E.Mey.) Eckl. & Zeyh. accepted as Argyrolobium lunare (L.) Druce subsp. sericeum (Thunb.) T.J.Edwards, endemic
- Argyrolobium lancifolium Burtt Davy, accepted as Argyrolobium transvaalense Schinz, endemic
- Argyrolobium longifolium (Meisn.) Walp. endemic
- Argyrolobium lotoides Harv. indigenous
- Argyrolobium lunare (L.) Druce, endemic
  - Argyrolobium lunare (L.) Druce subsp. lunare, endemic
  - Argyrolobium lunare (L.) Druce subsp. sericeum (Thunb.) T.J.Edwards, endemic
- Argyrolobium lydenburgense Harms, accepted as Argyrolobium tuberosum Eckl. & Zeyh. endemic
- Argyrolobium marginatum Bolus, indigenous
- Argyrolobium megarrhizum Bolus, endemic
- Argyrolobium molle Eckl. & Zeyh. endemic
- Argyrolobium muddii Dummer, endemic
- Argyrolobium muirii L.Bolus, accepted as Argyrolobium filiforme (Thunb.) Eckl. & Zeyh. endemic
- Argyrolobium nanum Burtt Davy, accepted as Argyrolobium molle Eckl. & Zeyh. present
- Argyrolobium nanum Schltr. ex Harms, endemic
- Argyrolobium nanum Walp., accepted as Argyrolobium nigrescens Dummer, present
- Argyrolobium natalense Dummer, accepted as Argyrolobium longifolium (Meisn.) Walp. present
- Argyrolobium nigrescens Dummer, indigenous
- Argyrolobium parviflorum T.J.Edwards, endemic
- Argyrolobium patens Eckl. & Zeyh. accepted as Argyrolobium molle Eckl. & Zeyh. endemic
- Argyrolobium pauciflorum Eckl. & Zeyh. indigenous
  - Argyrolobium pauciflorum Eckl. & Zeyh. var. semiglabrum Harv. accepted as Argyrolobium pauciflorum Eckl. & Zeyh. endemic
- Argyrolobium petiolare (E.Mey.) Steud., endemic
- Argyrolobium pilosum Harv. accepted as Argyrolobium amplexicaule (E.Mey.) Dummer, present
- Argyrolobium podalyrioides Dummer, accepted as Argyrolobium collinum Eckl. & Zeyh. present
- Argyrolobium polyphyllum Eckl. & Zeyh. endemic
- Argyrolobium pseudotuberosum T.J.Edwards, indigenous
- Argyrolobium pumilum Eckl. & Zeyh. endemic
- Argyrolobium rarum Dummer, endemic
- Argyrolobium robustum T.J.Edwards, endemic
- Argyrolobium rogersii N.E.Br. accepted as Argyrolobium rupestre (E.Mey.) Walp. subsp. rupestre, present
- Argyrolobium rotundifolium T.J.Edwards, indigenous
- Argyrolobium rupestre (E.Mey.) Walp. indigenous
  - Argyrolobium rupestre (E.Mey.) Walp. subsp. rupestre, indigenous
- Argyrolobium sandersonii Harv. accepted as Argyrolobium baptisioides (E.Mey.) Walp. indigenous
- Argyrolobium sankeyi Harms, endemic
- Argyrolobium sericeum (E.Mey.) Eckl. & Zeyh. accepted as Argyrolobium trifoliatum (Thunb.) Druce, endemic
- Argyrolobium sericosemium Harms, endemic
- Argyrolobium speciosum Eckl. & Zeyh. indigenous
  - Argyrolobium speciosum Eckl. & Zeyh. var. glaberrimum Harv. accepted as Argyrolobium baptisioides (E.Mey.) Walp. present
- Argyrolobium splendens (E.Mey.) Walp. endemic
- Argyrolobium stenorrhizon Oliv. accepted as Argyrolobium filiforme (Thunb.) Eckl. & Zeyh. present
- Argyrolobium stipulaceum Eckl. & Zeyh. indigenous
- Argyrolobium summomontanum Hilliard & B.L.Burtt, accepted as Argyrolobium candicans Eckl. & Zeyh. present
- Argyrolobium sutherlandii Harv. accepted as Argyrolobium baptisioides (E.Mey.) Walp. endemic
- Argyrolobium thodei Harms, accepted as Argyrolobium lotoides Harv. present
- Argyrolobium tomentosum (Andrews) Druce, indigenous
- Argyrolobium transvaalense Schinz, indigenous
- Argyrolobium trifoliatum (Thunb.) Druce, endemic
- Argyrolobium tuberosum Eckl. & Zeyh. indigenous
- Argyrolobium tysonii Harms, accepted as Argyrolobium rupestre (E.Mey.) Walp. subsp. rupestre, endemic
- Argyrolobium variopile N.E.Br. accepted as Argyrolobium lotoides Harv. present
- Argyrolobium velutinum Eckl. & Zeyh. endemic
- Argyrolobium venustum Eckl. & Zeyh. accepted as Argyrolobium pumilum Eckl. & Zeyh. present
- Argyrolobium wilmsii Harms, indigenous
- Argyrolobium woodii Dummer, accepted as Argyrolobium tuberosum Eckl. & Zeyh. endemic

=== Aspalathus ===
Genus Aspalathus:

- Aspalathus abbottii C.H.Stirt. & Muasya, endemic
- Aspalathus abietina Thunb. endemic
- Aspalathus acanthes Eckl. & Zeyh. endemic
- Aspalathus acanthiloba R.Dahlgren, endemic
- Aspalathus acanthoclada R.Dahlgren, endemic
- Aspalathus acanthophylla Eckl. & Zeyh. endemic
- Aspalathus acicularis E.Mey. indigenous
  - Aspalathus acicularis E.Mey. subsp. acicularis, indigenous
  - Aspalathus acicularis E.Mey. subsp. planifolia R.Dahlgren, endemic
- Aspalathus acidota Garab. ex R.Dahlgren, endemic
- Aspalathus acifera R.Dahlgren, endemic
- Aspalathus aciloba R.Dahlgren, endemic
- Aspalathus aciphylla Harv. endemic
- Aspalathus acocksii (R.Dahlgren) R.Dahlgren, endemic
- Aspalathus aculeata Thunb. endemic
- Aspalathus acuminata Lam. indigenous
  - Aspalathus acuminata Lam. subsp. acuminata, endemic
  - Aspalathus acuminata Lam. subsp. pungens (nutsThunb.) R.Dahlgren, endemic
- Aspalathus acutiflora R.Dahlgren, endemic
- Aspalathus aemula E.Mey. endemic
- Aspalathus albens L. endemic
- Aspalathus alopecurus Benth. endemic
- Aspalathus alpestris (Benth.) R.Dahlgren, endemic
- Aspalathus altissima R.Dahlgren, endemic
- Aspalathus amoena (R.Dahlgren) R.Dahlgren, endemic
- Aspalathus angustifolia (Lam.) R.Dahlgren, indigenous
  - Aspalathus angustifolia (Lam.) R.Dahlgren subsp. angustifolia, endemic
  - Aspalathus angustifolia (Lam.) R.Dahlgren subsp. robusta (E.Phillips) R.Dahlgren, endemic
- Aspalathus araneosa L. endemic
- Aspalathus arenaria R.Dahlgren, endemic
- Aspalathus argyrella MacOwan, endemic
- Aspalathus argyrophanes R.Dahlgren, endemic
- Aspalathus arida E.Mey. indigenous
  - Aspalathus arida E.Mey. subsp. arida, endemic
  - Aspalathus arida E.Mey. subsp. erecta (E.Mey.) R.Dahlgren, endemic
  - Aspalathus arida E.Mey. subsp. procumbens (E.Mey.) R.Dahlgren, endemic
- Aspalathus aristata Compton, endemic
- Aspalathus aristifolia R.Dahlgren, endemic
- Aspalathus aspalathoides (L.) R.Dahlgren, endemic
- Aspalathus asparagoides L.f. indigenous
  - Aspalathus asparagoides L.f. subsp. asparagoides, endemic
  - Aspalathus asparagoides L.f. subsp. rubro-fusca (Eckl. & Zeyh.) R.Dahlgren, endemic
- Aspalathus astroites L. endemic
- Aspalathus attenuata R.Dahlgren, indigenous
- Aspalathus aurantiaca R.Dahlgren, endemic
- Aspalathus barbata (Lam.) R.Dahlgren, endemic
- Aspalathus barbigera R.Dahlgren, endemic
- Aspalathus batodes Eckl. & Zeyh. indigenous
  - Aspalathus batodes Eckl. & Zeyh. subsp. batodes, endemic
  - Aspalathus batodes Eckl. & Zeyh. subsp. spinulifolia R.Dahlgren, endemic
- Aspalathus bidouwensis Garab. ex R.Dahlgren, endemic
- Aspalathus biflora E.Mey. indigenous
  - Aspalathus biflora E.Mey. subsp. biflora, endemic
  - Aspalathus biflora E.Mey. subsp. longicarpa R.Dahlgren, endemic
- Aspalathus bodkinii Bolus, endemic
- Aspalathus borboniifolia R.Dahlgren, endemic
- Aspalathus bowieana (Benth.) R.Dahlgren, endemic
- Aspalathus bracteata Thunb. endemic
- Aspalathus brevicarpa (R.Dahlgren) R.Dahlgren, endemic
- Aspalathus burchelliana Benth. endemic
- Aspalathus caespitosa R.Dahlgren, endemic
- Aspalathus calcarata Harv. endemic
- Aspalathus calcarea R.Dahlgren, endemic
- Aspalathus caledonensis R.Dahlgren, endemic
- Aspalathus callosa L. endemic
- Aspalathus campestris R.Dahlgren, endemic
- Aspalathus candicans Aiton f. endemic
- Aspalathus candidula R.Dahlgren, endemic
- Aspalathus capensis (Walp.) R.Dahlgren, endemic
- Aspalathus capitata L. endemic
- Aspalathus carnosa P.J.Bergius, endemic
- Aspalathus cephalotes Thunb. indigenous
  - Aspalathus cephalotes Thunb. subsp. cephalotes, endemic
  - Aspalathus cephalotes Thunb. subsp. obscuriflora R.Dahlgren, endemic
  - Aspalathus cephalotes Thunb. subsp. violacea R.Dahlgren, endemic
- Aspalathus cerrhantha Eckl. & Zeyh. endemic
- Aspalathus chenopoda L. indigenous
  - Aspalathus chenopoda L. subsp. chenopoda, endemic
  - Aspalathus chenopoda L. subsp. gracilis (Eckl. & Zeyh.) R.Dahlgren, endemic
- Aspalathus chortophila Eckl. & Zeyh. indigenous
- Aspalathus chrysantha R.Dahlgren, endemic
- Aspalathus ciliaris L. endemic
- Aspalathus cinerascens E.Mey. endemic
- Aspalathus citrina R.Dahlgren, endemic
- Aspalathus cliffortiifolia R.Dahlgren, endemic
- Aspalathus cliffortioides Bolus, endemic
- Aspalathus collina Eckl. & Zeyh. indigenous
  - Aspalathus collina Eckl. & Zeyh. subsp. collina, endemic
  - Aspalathus collina Eckl. & Zeyh. subsp. luculenta R.Dahlgren, endemic
- Aspalathus commutata (Vogel) R.Dahlgren, endemic
- Aspalathus compacta R.Dahlgren, endemic
- Aspalathus complicata (Benth.) R.Dahlgren, endemic
- Aspalathus comptonii R.Dahlgren, endemic
- Aspalathus concava Bolus, endemic
- Aspalathus condensata R.Dahlgren, endemic
- Aspalathus confusa R.Dahlgren, endemic
- Aspalathus congesta (R.Dahlgren) R.Dahlgren, endemic
- Aspalathus cordata (L.) R.Dahlgren, endemic
- Aspalathus cordicarpa R.Dahlgren, endemic
- Aspalathus corniculata R.Dahlgren, endemic
- Aspalathus corrudifolia P.J.Bergius, endemic
- Aspalathus costulata Benth. endemic
- Aspalathus crassisepala R.Dahlgren, endemic
- Aspalathus crenata (L.) R.Dahlgren, endemic
- Aspalathus crewiana Boatwr. & Cupido, endemic
- Aspalathus cuspidata R.Dahlgren, endemic
- Aspalathus cymbiformis DC. endemic
- Aspalathus cytisoides Lam. endemic
- Aspalathus dasyantha Eckl. & Zeyh. endemic
- Aspalathus decora R.Dahlgren, endemic
- Aspalathus densifolia Benth. endemic
- Aspalathus desertorum Bolus, endemic
- Aspalathus dianthopora E.Phillips, endemic
- Aspalathus diffusa Eckl. & Zeyh. endemic
- Aspalathus digitifolia R.Dahlgren, endemic
- Aspalathus divaricata Thunb. indigenous
  - Aspalathus divaricata Thunb. subsp. divaricata, endemic
  - Aspalathus divaricata Thunb. subsp. gracilior R.Dahlgren, endemic
- Aspalathus dunsdoniana Alston ex R.Dahlgren, endemic
- Aspalathus elliptica (E.Phillips) R.Dahlgren, endemic
- Aspalathus empetrifolia (R.Dahlgren) R.Dahlgren, endemic
- Aspalathus ericifolia L. indigenous
  - Aspalathus ericifolia L. subsp. ericifolia, endemic
  - Aspalathus ericifolia L. subsp. minuta R.Dahlgren, endemic
  - Aspalathus ericifolia L. subsp. pusilla R.Dahlgren, endemic
- Aspalathus erythrodes Eckl. & Zeyh. endemic
- Aspalathus esterhuyseniae R.Dahlgren, endemic
- Aspalathus excelsa R.Dahlgren, endemic
- Aspalathus fasciculata (Thunb.) R.Dahlgren, endemic
- Aspalathus ferox Harv. endemic
- Aspalathus filicaulis Eckl. & Zeyh. endemic
- Aspalathus flexuosa Thunb. endemic
- Aspalathus florifera R.Dahlgren, endemic
- Aspalathus florulenta R.Dahlgren, endemic
- Aspalathus forbesii Harv. endemic
- Aspalathus fourcadei L.Bolus, endemic
- Aspalathus frankenioides DC. endemic
- Aspalathus fusca Thunb. endemic
- Aspalathus galeata E.Mey. endemic
- Aspalathus gerrardii Bolus, endemic
- Aspalathus glabrata R.Dahlgren, endemic
- Aspalathus glabrescens R.Dahlgren, endemic
- Aspalathus globosa Andrews, endemic
- Aspalathus globulosa E.Mey. endemic
- Aspalathus glossoides R.Dahlgren, endemic
- Aspalathus grandiflora Benth. endemic
- Aspalathus granulata R.Dahlgren, endemic
- Aspalathus grobleri R.Dahlgren, endemic
- Aspalathus heterophylla L.f. endemic
- Aspalathus hirta E.Mey. endemic
  - Aspalathus hirta E.Mey. subsp. hirta, endemic
  - Aspalathus hirta E.Mey. subsp. stellaris R.Dahlgren, endemic
- Aspalathus hispida Thunb. indigenous
  - Aspalathus hispida Thunb. subsp. albiflora (Eckl. & Zeyh.) R.Dahlgren, endemic
  - Aspalathus hispida Thunb. subsp. hispida, indigenous
- Aspalathus horizontalis (R.Dahlgren) R.Dahlgren, endemic
- Aspalathus humilis Bolus, endemic
- Aspalathus hypnoides R.Dahlgren, endemic
- Aspalathus hystrix L.f. endemic
- Aspalathus incana R.Dahlgren, endemic
- Aspalathus incompta Thunb. endemic
- Aspalathus incurva Thunb. endemic
- Aspalathus incurvifolia Vogel ex Walp. endemic
- Aspalathus inops Eckl. & Zeyh. endemic
- Aspalathus intermedia Eckl. & Zeyh. endemic
- Aspalathus intervallaris Bolus, endemic
- Aspalathus intricata Compton, indigenous
  - Aspalathus intricata Compton subsp. anthospermoides (R.Dahlgren) R.Dahlgren, endemic
  - Aspalathus intricata Compton subsp. intricata, endemic
  - Aspalathus intricata Compton subsp. oxyclada (Compton) R.Dahlgren, endemic
- Aspalathus isolata (R.Dahlgren) R.Dahlgren, endemic
- Aspalathus joubertiana Eckl. & Zeyh. endemic
- Aspalathus juniperina Thunb. indigenous
  - Aspalathus juniperina Thunb. subsp. gracilifolia (R.Dahlgren) R.Dahlgren, endemic
  - Aspalathus juniperina Thunb. subsp. grandis R.Dahlgren, endemic
  - Aspalathus juniperina Thunb. subsp. juniperina, endemic
  - Aspalathus juniperina Thunb. subsp. monticola R.Dahlgren, endemic
- Aspalathus karrooensis R.Dahlgren, endemic
- Aspalathus katbergensis (R.Dahlgren) R.Dahlgren, endemic
- Aspalathus keeromsbergensis R.Dahlgren, endemic
- Aspalathus kougaensis (Garab. ex R.Dahlgren) R.Dahlgren, endemic
- Aspalathus lactea Thunb. indigenous
  - Aspalathus lactea Thunb. subsp. breviloba R.Dahlgren, endemic
  - Aspalathus lactea Thunb. subsp. lactea, endemic
- Aspalathus laeta Bolus, endemic
- Aspalathus lamarckiana R.Dahlgren, endemic
- Aspalathus lanata E.Mey. endemic
- Aspalathus lanceicarpa R.Dahlgren, endemic
- Aspalathus lanceifolia R.Dahlgren, endemic
- Aspalathus lanifera R.Dahlgren, endemic
- Aspalathus laricifolia P.J.Bergius, indigenous
  - Aspalathus laricifolia P.J.Bergius subsp. canescens (L.) R.Dahlgren, endemic
  - Aspalathus laricifolia P.J.Bergius subsp. laricifolia, endemic
- Aspalathus latifolia Bolus, endemic
- Aspalathus lebeckioides R.Dahlgren, endemic
- Aspalathus lenticula Bolus, endemic
- Aspalathus leptocoma Eckl. & Zeyh. endemic
- Aspalathus leptoptera Bolus, endemic
- Aspalathus leucophylla R.Dahlgren, endemic
- Aspalathus linearifolia (Burm.f.) DC., endemic
- Aspalathus linearis (Burm.f.) R.Dahlgren, endemic
- Aspalathus linguiloba R.Dahlgren, endemic
- Aspalathus longifolia Benth. endemic
- Aspalathus longipes Harv. endemic
- Aspalathus lotiflora R.Dahlgren, endemic
- Aspalathus lotoides Thunb. indigenous
  - Aspalathus lotoides Thunb. subsp. lagopus (Thunb.) R.Dahlgren, endemic
  - Aspalathus lotoides Thunb. subsp. lotoides, endemic
- Aspalathus macrantha Harv. endemic
- Aspalathus macrocarpa Eckl. & Zeyh. endemic
- Aspalathus marginalis Eckl. & Zeyh. endemic
- Aspalathus marginata Harv. endemic
- Aspalathus microphylla DC. endemic
- Aspalathus millefolia R.Dahlgren, endemic
- Aspalathus monosperma (DC.) R.Dahlgren, endemic
- Aspalathus mundiana Eckl. & Zeyh. endemic
- Aspalathus muraltioides Eckl. & Zeyh. endemic
- Aspalathus myrtillifolia Benth. endemic
- Aspalathus neglecta T.M.Salter, endemic
- Aspalathus nigra L. endemic
- Aspalathus nivea Thunb. endemic
- Aspalathus nudiflora Harv. endemic
- Aspalathus obliqua R.Dahlgren, endemic
- Aspalathus oblongifolia R.Dahlgren, endemic
- Aspalathus obtusata Thunb. endemic
- Aspalathus obtusifolia R.Dahlgren, endemic
- Aspalathus odontoloba R.Dahlgren, endemic
- Aspalathus oliveri R.Dahlgren, endemic
- Aspalathus opaca Eckl. & Zeyh. indigenous
  - Aspalathus opaca Eckl. & Zeyh. subsp. opaca, endemic
  - Aspalathus opaca Eckl. & Zeyh. subsp. pappeana (Harv.) R.Dahlgren, endemic
  - Aspalathus opaca Eckl. & Zeyh. subsp. rostriloba R.Dahlgren, endemic
- Aspalathus orbiculata Benth. endemic
- Aspalathus pachyloba Benth. indigenous
  - Aspalathus pachyloba Benth. subsp. macroclada R.Dahlgren, endemic
  - Aspalathus pachyloba Benth. subsp. pachyloba, endemic
  - Aspalathus pachyloba Benth. subsp. rugulicarpa R.Dahlgren, endemic
  - Aspalathus pachyloba Benth. subsp. succulentifolia R.Dahlgren, accepted as Aspalathus pachyloba Benth. subsp. villicaulis R.Dahlgren, present
  - Aspalathus pachyloba Benth. subsp. villicaulis R.Dahlgren, endemic
- Aspalathus pallescens Eckl. & Zeyh. endemic
- Aspalathus pallidiflora R.Dahlgren, endemic
- Aspalathus pappeana Harv. accepted as Aspalathus opaca Eckl. & Zeyh. subsp. pappeana (Harv.) R.Dahlgren, present
- Aspalathus parviflora P.J.Bergius, endemic
- Aspalathus patens Garab. ex R.Dahlgren, endemic
- Aspalathus pedicellata Harv. endemic
- Aspalathus pedunculata Houtt., endemic
- Aspalathus pendula R.Dahlgren, endemic
- Aspalathus perfoliata (Lam.) R.Dahlgren, indigenous
  - Aspalathus perfoliata (Lam.) R.Dahlgren subsp. perfoliata, endemic
  - Aspalathus perfoliata (Lam.) R.Dahlgren subsp. phillipsii R.Dahlgren, endemic
- Aspalathus perforata (Thunb.) R.Dahlgren, endemic
- Aspalathus petersonii R.Dahlgren, endemic
- Aspalathus pigmentosa R.Dahlgren, endemic
- Aspalathus pilantha R.Dahlgren, endemic
- Aspalathus pinea Thunb. indigenous
  - Aspalathus pinea Thunb. subsp. caudata R.Dahlgren, endemic
  - Aspalathus pinea Thunb. subsp. pinea, endemic
- Aspalathus pinguis Thunb. indigenous
  - Aspalathus pinguis Thunb. subsp. australis R.Dahlgren, endemic
  - Aspalathus pinguis Thunb. subsp. longissima R.Dahlgren, endemic
  - Aspalathus pinguis Thunb. subsp. occidentalis R.Dahlgren, endemic
  - Aspalathus pinguis Thunb. subsp. pinguis, endemic
- Aspalathus polycephala E.Mey. indigenous
  - Aspalathus polycephala E.Mey. subsp. lanatifolia R.Dahlgren, endemic
  - Aspalathus polycephala E.Mey. subsp. polycephala, endemic
  - Aspalathus polycephala E.Mey. subsp. rigida (Schltr.) R.Dahlgren, endemic
- Aspalathus potbergensis R.Dahlgren, endemic
- Aspalathus proboscidea R.Dahlgren, endemic
- Aspalathus prostrata Eckl. & Zeyh. endemic
- Aspalathus psoraleoides (C.Presl) Benth. endemic
- Aspalathus puberula (Eckl. & Zeyh.) R.Dahlgren, endemic
- Aspalathus pulicifolia R.Dahlgren, endemic
- Aspalathus pycnantha R.Dahlgren, endemic
- Aspalathus quadrata L.Bolus, endemic
- Aspalathus quinquefolia L. indigenous
  - Aspalathus quinquefolia L. subsp. compacta R.Dahlgren, endemic
  - Aspalathus quinquefolia L. subsp. hispida (Thunb.) R.Dahlgren, endemic
  - Aspalathus quinquefolia L. subsp. quinquefolia, endemic
  - Aspalathus quinquefolia L. subsp. virgata (Thunb.) R.Dahlgren, endemic
- Aspalathus radiata Garab. ex R.Dahlgren, indigenous
  - Aspalathus radiata Garab. ex R.Dahlgren subsp. pseudosericea R.Dahlgren, endemic
  - Aspalathus radiata Garab. ex R.Dahlgren subsp. radiata, endemic
- Aspalathus ramosissima R.Dahlgren, endemic
- Aspalathus ramulosa E.Mey. endemic
- Aspalathus rectistyla R.Dahlgren, endemic
- Aspalathus recurva Benth. endemic
- Aspalathus recurvispina R.Dahlgren, endemic
- Aspalathus repens R.Dahlgren, endemic
- Aspalathus retroflexa L. indigenous
  - Aspalathus retroflexa L. subsp. angustipetala R.Dahlgren, endemic
  - Aspalathus retroflexa L. subsp. bicolor (Eckl. & Zeyh.) R.Dahlgren, endemic
  - Aspalathus retroflexa L. subsp. retroflexa, endemic
- Aspalathus rigidifolia R.Dahlgren, endemic
- Aspalathus rosea Garab. ex R.Dahlgren, endemic
- Aspalathus rostrata Benth. endemic
- Aspalathus rostripetala R.Dahlgren, endemic
- Aspalathus rubens Thunb. endemic
- Aspalathus rubiginosa R.Dahlgren, endemic
- Aspalathus rugosa Thunb. endemic
- Aspalathus rupestris R.Dahlgren, endemic
- Aspalathus rycroftii R.Dahlgren, endemic
- Aspalathus salicifolia R.Dahlgren, endemic
- Aspalathus salteri L.Bolus, endemic
- Aspalathus sanguinea Thunb. indigenous
  - Aspalathus sanguinea Thunb. subsp. foliosa R.Dahlgren, endemic
  - Aspalathus sanguinea Thunb. subsp. sanguinea, endemic
- Aspalathus sceptrum-aureum R.Dahlgren, endemic
- Aspalathus secunda E.Mey. endemic
- Aspalathus securifolia Eckl. & Zeyh. endemic
- Aspalathus sericea P.J.Bergius, endemic
- Aspalathus serpens R.Dahlgren, endemic
- Aspalathus setacea Eckl. & Zeyh. endemic
- Aspalathus shawii L.Bolus, indigenous
  - Aspalathus shawii L.Bolus subsp. glabripetala (R.Dahlgren) R.Dahlgren, endemic
  - Aspalathus shawii L.Bolus subsp. longispica (R.Dahlgren) R.Dahlgren, endemic
  - Aspalathus shawii L.Bolus subsp. shawii, endemic
- Aspalathus simii Bolus, endemic
- Aspalathus singuliflora R.Dahlgren, endemic
- Aspalathus smithii R.Dahlgren, endemic
- Aspalathus spectabilis R.Dahlgren, endemic
- Aspalathus spicata Thunb. endemic
- Aspalathus spiculata R.Dahlgren, endemic
- Aspalathus spinescens Thunb. indigenous
  - Aspalathus spinescens Thunb. subsp. lepida (E.Mey.) R.Dahlgren, endemic
  - Aspalathus spinescens Thunb. subsp. spinescens, endemic
- Aspalathus spinosa L. endemic
  - Aspalathus spinosa L. subsp. flavispina (C.Presl ex Benth.) R.Dahlgren, endemic
  - Aspalathus spinosa L. subsp. glauca (Eckl. & Zeyh.) R.Dahlgren, endemic
  - Aspalathus spinosa L. subsp. spinosa, endemic
- Aspalathus spinosissima R.Dahlgren, indigenous
  - Aspalathus spinosissima R.Dahlgren subsp. spinosissima, endemic
  - Aspalathus spinosissima R.Dahlgren subsp. tenuiflora R.Dahlgren, endemic
- Aspalathus stenophylla Eckl. & Zeyh. endemic
- Aspalathus steudeliana Brongn. endemic
- Aspalathus stokoei L.Bolus, endemic
- Aspalathus stricticlada (R.Dahlgren) R.Dahlgren, endemic
- Aspalathus suaveolens Eckl. & Zeyh. endemic
- Aspalathus submissa R.Dahlgren, endemic
- Aspalathus subtingens Eckl. & Zeyh. endemic
- Aspalathus subulata Thunb. endemic
- Aspalathus sulphurea R.Dahlgren, endemic
- Aspalathus taylorii R.Dahlgren, endemic
- Aspalathus tenuissima R.Dahlgren, endemic
- Aspalathus teres Eckl. & Zeyh. indigenous
  - Aspalathus teres Eckl. & Zeyh. subsp. teres, endemic
  - Aspalathus teres Eckl. & Zeyh. subsp. thodei R.Dahlgren, endemic
- Aspalathus ternata (Thunb.) Druce, endemic
- Aspalathus theresae Cupido, endemic
- Aspalathus tridentata L. indigenous
  - Aspalathus tridentata L. subsp. fragilis R.Dahlgren, endemic
  - Aspalathus tridentata L. subsp. rotunda R.Dahlgren, endemic
  - Aspalathus tridentata L. subsp. staurantha (Eckl. & Zeyh.) R.Dahlgren, endemic
  - Aspalathus tridentata L. subsp. tridentata, endemic
- Aspalathus triquetra Thunb. endemic
- Aspalathus truncata Eckl. & Zeyh. endemic
- Aspalathus tuberculata Walp. endemic
- Aspalathus tulbaghensis R.Dahlgren, endemic
- Aspalathus tylodes Eckl. & Zeyh. endemic
- Aspalathus ulicina Eckl. & Zeyh. indigenous
  - Aspalathus ulicina Eckl. & Zeyh. subsp. kardouwensis R.Dahlgren, endemic
  - Aspalathus ulicina Eckl. & Zeyh. subsp. ulicina, endemic
- Aspalathus uniflora L. endemic
- Aspalathus vacciniifolia R.Dahlgren, endemic
- Aspalathus varians Eckl. & Zeyh. endemic
- Aspalathus variegata Eckl. & Zeyh. endemic
- Aspalathus venosa E.Mey. endemic
- Aspalathus verbasciformis R.Dahlgren, endemic
- Aspalathus vermiculata Lam. endemic
- Aspalathus villosa Thunb. endemic
- Aspalathus vulnerans Thunb. endemic
- Aspalathus vulpina Garab. ex R.Dahlgren, endemic
- Aspalathus willdenowiana Benth. endemic
- Aspalathus wittebergensis Compton & P.E.Barnes, endemic
- Aspalathus wurmbeana E.Mey. endemic
- Aspalathus zeyheri (Harv.) R.Dahlgren, endemic

=== Astragalus ===
Genus Astragalus:

- Astragalus atropilosulus (Hochst.) Bunge, indigenous
  - Astragalus atropilosulus (Hochst.) Bunge subsp. burkeanus (Harv.) J.B.Gillett var. burkeanus, indigenous
- Astragalus bisulcatus (Hook.) A.Gray, not indigenous, naturalised

=== Baphia ===
Genus Baphia:

- Baphia massaiensis Taub. indigenous
  - Baphia massaiensis Taub. subsp. obovata (Schinz) Brummitt var. obovata, indigenous
- Baphia racemosa (Hochst.) Baker, endemic

=== Bauhinia ===
Genus Bauhinia:

- Bauhinia bowkeri Harv. endemic
- Bauhinia forficata Link, not indigenous, cultivated, naturalised, invasive
- Bauhinia galpinii N.E.Br. indigenous
- Bauhinia marlothii Engl. accepted as Adenolobus pechuelii (Kuntze) Torre & Hillc. subsp. pechuelii
- Bauhinia natalensis Oliv. ex Hook. endemic
- Bauhinia petersiana Bolle, indigenous
  - Bauhinia petersiana Bolle subsp. macrantha (Oliv.) Brummitt & J.H.Ross, indigenous
- Bauhinia purpurea L. not indigenous, naturalised, invasive
- Bauhinia tomentosa L. indigenous
- Bauhinia variegata L. not indigenous, naturalised, invasive
  - Bauhinia variegata L. var. variegata, not indigenous, naturalised, invasive

=== Bituminaria ===
Genus Bituminaria:

- Bituminaria acaulis (Stev.) C.H.Stirt. indigenous
- Bituminaria bituminosa (L.) C.H.Stirt. indigenous

=== Bolusafra ===
Genus Bolusafra:

- Bolusafra bituminosa (L.) Kuntze, endemic

=== Bolusanthus ===
Genus Bolusanthus:

- Bolusanthus speciosus (Bolus) Harms, indigenous

=== Bolusia ===
Genus Bolusia:

- Bolusia acuminata (DC.) Polhill, indigenous
- Bolusia capensis Benth. accepted as Bolusia acuminata (DC.) Polhill, present

=== Brachystegia ===
Genus Brachystegia:

- Brachystegia spiciformis Benth. indigenous
  - Brachystegia spiciformis Benth. var. schmitzii Hoyle, accepted as Brachystegia spiciformis Benth.
  - Brachystegia spiciformis Benth. var. spiciformis, endemic

=== Burkea ===
Genus Burkea:

- Burkea africana Hook. indigenous
  - Burkea africana Hook. var. cordata Welw. ex Oliv. accepted as Burkea africana Hook. indigenous

=== Caesalpinia ===
Genus Caesalpinia:

- Caesalpinia bonduc (L.) Roxb. accepted as Guilandina bonduc L. indigenous
- Caesalpinia bonducella (L.) Fleming, accepted as Guilandina bonduc L. indigenous
- Caesalpinia bracteata Germish. endemic
- Caesalpinia decapetala (Roth) Alston, not indigenous, naturalised, invasive
- Caesalpinia gilliesii (Wall. ex Hook.) D.Dietr. not indigenous, naturalised, invasive
- Caesalpinia pulcherrima (L.) Sw. not indigenous, naturalised
- Caesalpinia rostrata N.E.Br. indigenous
- Caesalpinia spinosa (Molina) Kuntze, not indigenous, naturalised

=== Cajanus ===
Genus Cajanus:

- Cajanus cajan (L.) Millsp. not indigenous, cultivated, naturalised

=== Calliandra ===
Genus Calliandra:

- Calliandra redacta (J.H.Ross) Thulin & Asfaw, endemic

=== Calobota ===
Genus Calobota:

- Calobota acanthoclada (Dinter) Boatwr. & B.-E.van Wyk, indigenous
- Calobota angustifolia (E.Mey.) Boatwr. & B.-E.van Wyk, indigenous
- Calobota cinerea (E.Mey.) Boatwr. & B.-E.van Wyk, indigenous
- Calobota cuspidosa (Burch.) Boatwr. & B.-E.van Wyk, indigenous
- Calobota cytisoides (Berg.) Eckl. & Zeyh. endemic
- Calobota elongata (Thunb.) Boatwr. & B.-E.van Wyk, endemic
- Calobota halenbergensis (Merxm. & Schreib.) Boatwr. & B.-E.van Wyk, indigenous
- Calobota linearifolia (E.Mey.) Boatwr. & B.-E.van Wyk, indigenous
- Calobota lotononoides (Schltr.) Boatwr. & B.-E.van Wyk, endemic
- Calobota psiloloba (E.Mey.) Boatwr. & B.-E.van Wyk, endemic
- Calobota pungens (Thunb.) Boatwr. & B.-E.van Wyk, endemic
- Calobota sericea (Thunb.) Boatwr. & B.-E.van Wyk, endemic
- Calobota spinescens (Harv.) Boatwr. & B.-E.van Wyk, indigenous

=== Calpurnia ===
Genus Calpurnia:

- Calpurnia aurea (Aiton) Benth. indigenous
  - Calpurnia aurea (Aiton) Benth. subsp. aurea, indigenous
  - Calpurnia aurea (Aiton) Benth. subsp. sylvatica (Burch.) Brummitt, accepted as Calpurnia aurea (Aiton) Benth. subsp. aurea, present
- Calpurnia capensis (Burm.f.) Druce, endemic
- Calpurnia floribunda Harv. endemic
- Calpurnia glabrata Brummitt, indigenous
- Calpurnia intrusa (R.Br.in W.T.Aiton) E.Mey. endemic
- Calpurnia reflexa A.J.Beaumont, indigenous
- Calpurnia sericea Harv. indigenous
- Calpurnia villosa Harv. accepted as Calpurnia intrusa (R.Br.in W.T.Aiton) E.Mey. present
  - Calpurnia villosa Harv. var. intrusa (R.Br. ex Aiton f.) E.Mey. accepted as Calpurnia intrusa (R.Br.in W.T.Aiton) E.Mey. present
- Calpurnia woodii Schinz, endemic

=== Canavalia ===
Genus Canavalia:

- Canavalia africana Dunn, indigenous
- Canavalia bonariensis Lindl. indigenous
- Canavalia cryptodon Meisn. accepted as Canavalia bonariensis Lindl. indigenous
- Canavalia ensiformis (L.) DC. indigenous
- Canavalia ferruginea Piper, accepted as Canavalia africana Dunn, indigenous
- Canavalia gladiata (Jacq.) DC. not indigenous, naturalised
- Canavalia maritima Thouars, accepted as Canavalia rosea (Sw.) DC. present
- Canavalia monodon E.Mey. accepted as Canavalia bonariensis Lindl. indigenous
- Canavalia obtusifolia (Lam.) DC. accepted as Canavalia rosea (Sw.) DC.
- Canavalia rosea (Sw.) DC. indigenous
- Canavalia virosa (Roxb.) Wight & Arn. accepted as Canavalia africana Dunn, indigenous

=== Capassa ===
Genus Capassa:

- Capassa violacea Klotzsch, accepted as Philenoptera violacea (Klotzsch) Schrire, indigenous

=== Cassia ===
Genus Cassia:

- Cassia abbreviata Oliv. indigenous
  - Cassia abbreviata Oliv. subsp. beareana (Holmes) Brenan, indigenous

=== Ceratonia ===
Genus Ceratonia:

- Ceratonia siliqua L. not indigenous, cultivated, naturalised

=== Chamaecrista ===
Genus Chamaecrista:

- Chamaecrista absus (L.) H.S.Irwin & Barneby, indigenous
- Chamaecrista biensis (Steyaert) Lock, indigenous
- Chamaecrista capensis (Thunb.) E.Mey. indigenous
  - Chamaecrista capensis (Thunb.) E.Mey. var. capensis, indigenous
  - Chamaecrista capensis (Thunb.) E.Mey. var. flavescens (Thunb.) E.Mey. indigenous
- Chamaecrista comosa E.Mey. indigenous
  - Chamaecrista comosa E.Mey. var. capricornia (Steyaert) Lock, indigenous
  - Chamaecrista comosa E.Mey. var. comosa, indigenous
- Chamaecrista huillensis (MendonÃ§a & Torre) Lock, indigenous
- Chamaecrista mimosoides (L.) Greene, indigenous
- Chamaecrista plumosa E.Mey. indigenous
  - Chamaecrista plumosa E.Mey. var. erecta (Schorn & Gordon-Gray) Lock, endemic
  - Chamaecrista plumosa E.Mey. var. plumosa, indigenous
- Chamaecrista stricta E.Mey. indigenous

=== Chamaecytisus ===
Genus Chamaecytisus:

- Chamaecytisus prolifer (L.f.) Link subsp. palmensis (Christ) G.Kunkel, not indigenous, cultivated, naturalised, invasive

=== Chasmone ===
Genus Chasmone:

- Chasmone andrewsiana E.Mey. accepted as Argyrolobium tomentosum (Andrews) Druce, present
  - Chasmone andrewsiana E.Mey. var. umbellata E.Mey. accepted as Argyrolobium tomentosum (Andrews) Druce
- Chasmone apiculata E.Mey. accepted as Argyrolobium molle Eckl. & Zeyh. present
- Chasmone argentea (Jacq.) E.Mey. var. pilosa E.Mey. accepted as Argyrolobium argenteum Eckl. & Zeyh. present
- Chasmone diversifolia E.Mey. accepted as Argyrolobium speciosum Eckl. & Zeyh. present
- Chasmone goodioides Meisn. accepted as Argyrolobium crassifolium Eckl. & Zeyh. present
- Chasmone holosericea E.Mey. var. incana Meisn. accepted as Argyrolobium incanum Eckl. & Zeyh. present
- Chasmone obcordata E.Mey. accepted as Argyrolobium trifoliatum (Thunb.) Druce, present
- Chasmone sessiliflora E.Mey. var. interrupta E.Mey. accepted as Argyrolobium candicans Eckl. & Zeyh. present
  - Chasmone sessiliflora E.Mey. var. parvifolia E.Mey. accepted as Argyrolobium candicans Eckl. & Zeyh. present
- Chasmone stricta E.Mey. accepted as Argyrolobium pauciflorum Eckl. & Zeyh. present
- Chasmone venosa E.Mey. accepted as Argyrolobium molle Eckl. & Zeyh. present
  - Chasmone venosa E.Mey. var. obscura E.Mey. accepted as Argyrolobium molle Eckl. & Zeyh. present
- Chasmone verticillata E.Mey. accepted as Argyrolobium stipulaceum Eckl. & Zeyh. present

=== Chirocalyx ===
Genus Chirocalyx:

- Chirocalyx mollissimus Meisn. accepted as Erythrina latissima E.Mey. present

=== Clitoria ===
Genus Clitoria:

- Clitoria ternatea L. var. ternatea, not indigenous, naturalised

=== Coelidium ===
Genus Coelidium:

- Coelidium amphithaleoides Dummer, accepted as Amphithalea muraltioides (Benth.) A.L.Schutte, present
- Coelidium bowiei Benth. accepted as Amphithalea bowiei (Benth.) A.L.Schutte, present
- Coelidium bullatum Benth. accepted as Amphithalea bullata (Benth.) A.L.Schutte, present
- Coelidium cedarbergense Granby, accepted as Amphithalea cedarbergensis (Granby) A.L.Schutte, present
- Coelidium ciliare (Eckl. & Zeyh.) Walp. accepted as Amphithalea ciliaris Eckl. & Zeyh. present
- Coelidium cymbifolium C.A.Sm. accepted as Amphithalea cymbifolia (C.A.Sm.) A.L.Schutte, present
- Coelidium dahlgrenii Granby, accepted as Amphithalea dahlgrenii (Granby) A.L.Schutte, present
- Coelidium esterhuyseniae Granby, accepted as Amphithalea esterhuyseniae (Granby) A.L.Schutte, present
- Coelidium flavum Granby, accepted as Amphithalea flava (Granby) A.L.Schutte, present
- Coelidium humile Schltr. accepted as Amphithalea monticola A.L.Schutte, present
- Coelidium minimum Granby, accepted as Amphithalea minima (Granby) A.L.Schutte, present
- Coelidium muirii Granby, accepted as Amphithalea muirii (Granby) A.L.Schutte, present
- Coelidium muraltioides Benth. accepted as Amphithalea muraltioides (Benth.) A.L.Schutte, present
- Coelidium obtusilobum Granby, accepted as Amphithalea obtusiloba (Granby) A.L.Schutte, present
- Coelidium pageae L.Bolus, accepted as Amphithalea pageae (L.Bolus) A.L.Schutte, present
- Coelidium parvifolium (Thunb.) Druce, accepted as Amphithalea parvifolia (Thunb.) A.L.Schutte, present
- Coelidium perplexum (Eckl. & Zeyh.) Granby, accepted as Amphithalea perplexa Eckl. & Zeyh. present
- Coelidium purpureum Granby, accepted as Amphithalea purpurea (Granby) A.L.Schutte, present
- Coelidium spinosum Harv. accepted as Amphithalea spinosa (Harv.) A.L.Schutte, present
- Coelidium tortile (E.Mey.) Druce, accepted as Amphithalea tortilis (E.Mey.) Steud. present
- Coelidium villosum (Schltr.) Granby, accepted as Amphithalea villosa Schltr. present
- Coelidium vlokii A.L.Schutte & B.-E.van Wyk, accepted as Amphithalea vlokii (A.L.Schutte & B.-E.van Wyk) A.L.Schutte, present

=== Colophospermum ===
Genus Colophospermum:

- Colophospermum mopane (J.Kirk ex Benth.) J.Kirk ex J.Leonard, indigenous

=== Colutea ===
Genus Colutea:

- Colutea frutescens L. accepted as Lessertia frutescens (L.) Goldblatt & J.C.Manning subsp. frutescens, indigenous

=== Copisma ===
Genus Copisma:

- Copisma paniculatum E.Mey. accepted as Rhynchosia totta (Thunb.) DC. var. totta, indigenous
- Copisma pilosum E.Mey. accepted as Rhynchosia totta (Thunb.) DC. var. totta, indigenous
- Copisma tottum (Thunb.) E.Mey. accepted as Rhynchosia totta (Thunb.) DC. var. totta, indigenous

=== Cordyla ===
Genus Cordyla:

- Cordyla africana Lour. indigenous

=== Craibia ===
Genus Craibia:

- Craibia zimmermannii (Harms) Dunn, indigenous

=== Crotalaria ===
Genus Crotalaria:

- Crotalaria agatiflora Schweinf. not indigenous, naturalised, invasive
- Crotalaria anthyllopsis Welw. ex Baker, indigenous
- Crotalaria argyraea Welw. ex Baker, indigenous
- Crotalaria barkae Schweinf. indigenous
  - Crotalaria barkae Schweinf. subsp. barkae, indigenous
- Crotalaria barnabassii Dinter ex Baker f. indigenous
- Crotalaria brachycarpa (Benth.) Burtt Davy ex I.Verd. accepted as Crotalaria magaliesbergensis A.S.Flores & Sch.Rodr. indigenous
- Crotalaria brevidens Benth. var. intermedia (Kotschy) Polhill, not indigenous, naturalised
- Crotalaria burkeana Benth. indigenous
- Crotalaria capensis Jacq. indigenous
- Crotalaria damarensis Engl. indigenous
- Crotalaria diffusa E.Mey. accepted as Crotalaria excisa (Thunb.) Baker f. subsp. excisa, indigenous
- Crotalaria dinteri Schinz, indigenous
- Crotalaria distans Benth. indigenous
  - Crotalaria distans Benth. subsp. distans, indigenous
  - Crotalaria distans Benth. subsp. mediocris Polhill, indigenous
- Crotalaria doidgeae I.Verd. endemic
- Crotalaria dura J.M.Wood & M.S.Evans, indigenous
  - Crotalaria dura J.M.Wood & M.S.Evans subsp. dura, endemic
  - Crotalaria dura J.M.Wood & M.S.Evans subsp. mozambica Polhill, indigenous
- Crotalaria eckloniana C.Presl, accepted as Crotalaria excisa (Thunb.) Baker f. subsp. excisa, present
- Crotalaria effusa E.Mey. accepted as Crotalaria humilis Eckl. & Zeyh. indigenous
- Crotalaria eremicola Baker f. indigenous
  - Crotalaria eremicola Baker f. subsp. eremicola, indigenous
- Crotalaria excisa (Thunb.) Baker f. endemic
  - Crotalaria excisa (Thunb.) Baker f. subsp. excisa, endemic
  - Crotalaria excisa (Thunb.) Baker f. subsp. namaquensis Polhill, endemic
- Crotalaria gazensis Baker f. indigenous
  - Crotalaria gazensis Baker f. subsp. herbacea Polhill, indigenous
- Crotalaria globifera E.Mey. indigenous
- Crotalaria griquensis L.Bolus, indigenous
- Crotalaria humilis Eckl. & Zeyh. endemic
- Crotalaria juncea L. not indigenous, naturalised
- Crotalaria laburnifolia L. indigenous
  - Crotalaria laburnifolia L. subsp. australis (Baker f.) Polhill, indigenous
  - Crotalaria laburnifolia L. subsp. laburnifolia, indigenous
- Crotalaria lanceolata E.Mey. indigenous
- Crotalaria lanceolata E.Mey. subsp. lanceolata, indigenous
- Crotalaria lebeckioides Bond, endemic
- Crotalaria leubnitziana Schinz, indigenous
- Crotalaria longidens Burtt Davy ex I.Verd. endemic
- Crotalaria lotoides Benth. indigenous
- Crotalaria macrocarpa E.Mey. indigenous
  - Crotalaria macrocarpa E.Mey. subsp. macrocarpa, endemic
- Crotalaria magaliesbergensis A.S.Flores & Sch.Rodr. endemic
- Crotalaria meyeriana Steud. indigenous
- Crotalaria mollii Polhill, indigenous
- Crotalaria mollis E.Mey. accepted as Crotalaria meyeriana Steud. indigenous
- Crotalaria monophylla Germish. endemic
- Crotalaria monteiroi Taub. ex Baker f. indigenous
  - Crotalaria monteiroi Taub. ex Baker f. var. galpinii Burtt Davy ex I.Verd. indigenous
  - Crotalaria monteiroi Taub. ex Baker f. var. monteiroi, indigenous
- Crotalaria natalensis Baker f. endemic
- Crotalaria natalitia Meisn. indigenous
  - Crotalaria natalitia Meisn. var. natalitia, indigenous
- Crotalaria obscura DC. endemic
- Crotalaria orientalis Burtt Davy ex I.Verd. indigenous
  - Crotalaria orientalis Burtt Davy ex I.Verd. subsp. allenii (I.Verd.) Polhill & A.Schreib. indigenous
  - Crotalaria orientalis Burtt Davy ex I.Verd. subsp. orientalis, indigenous
- Crotalaria pallida Aiton, indigenous
  - Crotalaria pallida Aiton var. pallida, indigenous
- Crotalaria pearsonii Baker f. endemic
- Crotalaria pisicarpa Welw. ex Baker, indigenous
- Crotalaria podocarpa DC. indigenous
- Crotalaria prolifera E.Mey. accepted as Leobordea prolifera (E.Mey.) Eckl. & Zeyh. indigenous
- Crotalaria racemosa Thunb. accepted as Crotalaria excisa (Thunb.) Baker f. subsp. namaquensis Polhill, indigenous
- Crotalaria recta Steud. ex A.Rich. indigenous
- Crotalaria rhodesiae Baker f. indigenous
- Crotalaria schinzii Baker f. indigenous
- Crotalaria schlechteri Baker f. indigenous
- Crotalaria spartea Baker, indigenous
- Crotalaria spartioides DC. indigenous
- Crotalaria spectabilis Roth, not indigenous, naturalised
- Crotalaria sphaerocarpa Perr. ex DC. indigenous
  - Crotalaria sphaerocarpa Perr. ex DC. subsp. sphaerocarpa, indigenous
- Crotalaria steudneri Schweinf. indigenous
- Crotalaria thunbergiana Vogel ex Walp. accepted as Crotalaria excisa (Thunb.) Baker f. subsp. excisa, indigenous
- Crotalaria vasculosa Wall. ex Benth. indigenous
- Crotalaria virgulata Klotzsch, indigenous
  - Crotalaria virgulata Klotzsch subsp. grantiana (Harv.) Polhill, indigenous
- Crotalaria virgultalis Burch. ex DC. indigenous

=== Cullen ===
Genus Cullen:

- Cullen biflora (Harv.) C.H.Stirt. indigenous
- Cullen holubii (Burtt Davy) C.H.Stirt. endemic
- Cullen jaubertiana (Fenzl) C.H.Stirt. indigenous
- Cullen obtusifolia (DC.) C.H.Stirt. accepted as Cullen tomentosum (Thunb.) J.W.Grimes, present
- Cullen tomentosum (Thunb.) J.W.Grimes, indigenous

=== Cyamopsis ===
Genus Cyamopsis:

- Cyamopsis dentata (N.E.Br.) Torre, indigenous
- Cyamopsis serrata Schinz, indigenous
- Cyamopsis tetragonoloba (L.) Taub. not indigenous, naturalised

=== Cyclopia ===
Genus Cyclopia:

- Cyclopia alopecuroides A.L.Schutte, endemic
- Cyclopia alpina A.L.Schutte, endemic
- Cyclopia aurescens Kies, endemic
  - Cyclopia aurescens Kies var. glauca Kies, accepted as Cyclopia buxifolia (Burm.f.) Kies, present
- Cyclopia bolusii Hofmeyr & E.Phillips, endemic
- Cyclopia bowieana Harv. endemic
- Cyclopia burtonii Hofmeyr & E.Phillips, endemic
- Cyclopia buxifolia (Burm.f.) Kies, endemic
- Cyclopia capensis T.M.Salter, accepted as Cyclopia galioides (P.J.Bergius) DC., present
- Cyclopia dregeana Kies, accepted as Cyclopia buxifolia (Burm.f.) Kies, present
- Cyclopia falcata (Harv.) Kies, endemic
  - Cyclopia falcata (Harv.) Kies var. ovata Kies, accepted as Cyclopia buxifolia (Burm.f.) Kies, present
- Cyclopia filiformis Kies, endemic
- Cyclopia galioides (P.J.Bergius) DC., endemic
- Cyclopia genistoides (L.) R.Br., endemic
  - Cyclopia genistoides (L.) R.Br. var. heterophylla (Eckl. & Zeyh.) Harv. accepted as Cyclopia genistoides (L.) R.Br., present
  - Cyclopia genistoides (L.) R.Br. var. ovalifolia Kies, accepted as Cyclopia alpina A.L.Schutte, present
  - Cyclopia genistoides (L.) R.Br. var. teretifolia (Eckl. & Zeyh.) Kies, accepted as Cyclopia genistoides (L.) R.Br., present
- Cyclopia glabra (Hofmeyr & E.Phillips) A.L.Schutte, endemic
- Cyclopia intermedia E.Mey. endemic
- Cyclopia latifolia DC., endemic
- Cyclopia laxiflora Benth. endemic
- Cyclopia longifolia Vogel, endemic
- Cyclopia maculata (Andrews) Kies, endemic
- Cyclopia meyeriana Walp. endemic
- Cyclopia montana Hofmeyr & E.Phillips, accepted as Cyclopia meyeriana Walp. indigenous
  - Cyclopia montana Hofmeyr & E.Phillips var. glabra Hofmeyr & E.Phillips, accepted as Cyclopia glabra (Hofmeyr & E.Phillips) A.L.Schutte, indigenous
- Cyclopia plicata Kies, endemic
- Cyclopia pubescens Eckl. & Zeyh. endemic
- Cyclopia sessiliflora Eckl. & Zeyh., endemic
- Cyclopia squamosa A.L.Schutte, endemic
- Cyclopia subternata Vogel, endemic
  - Cyclopia subternata Vogel var. laxiflora (Benth.) Kies, accepted as Cyclopia laxiflora Benth. present

=== Cytisus ===
Genus Cytisus:

- Cytisus candicans (L.) Lam. accepted as Genista monspessulana (L.) L.A.S.Johnson, not indigenous, naturalised
- Cytisus scoparius (L.) Link, not indigenous, naturalised, invasive

=== Dalbergia ===
Genus Dalbergia:

- Dalbergia armata E.Mey. indigenous
- Dalbergia glandulosa Dunkley, accepted as Dalbergia martinii F.White
- Dalbergia melanoxylon Guill. & Perr. indigenous
- Dalbergia multijuga E.Mey. endemic
- Dalbergia nitidula Baker, indigenous
- Dalbergia obovata E.Mey. indigenous
- Dalbergia sissoo Roxb. ex DC. not indigenous, naturalised

=== Decorsea ===
Genus Decorsea:

- Decorsea galpinii (Burtt Davy) Verdc. endemic
- Decorsea schlechteri (Harms) Verdc. indigenous

=== Derris ===
Genus Derris:

- Derris trifoliata Lour. endemic
- Derris violacea (Klotzsch) Harms, accepted as Philenoptera violacea (Klotzsch) Schrire, indigenous

=== Desmanthus ===
Genus Desmanthus:

- Desmanthus virgatus (L.) Willd. not indigenous, naturalised

=== Desmodium ===
Genus Desmodium:

- Desmodium adscendens (Sw.) DC. indigenous
  - Desmodium adscendens (Sw.) DC. var. robustum B.G.Schub. indigenous
- Desmodium asperum (Poir.) Desr. indigenous
- Desmodium barbatum (L.) Benth. indigenous
  - Desmodium barbatum (L.) Benth. var. dimorphum (Welw. ex Baker) B.G.Schub. indigenous
- Desmodium dregeanum Benth. indigenous
- Desmodium gangeticum (L.) DC. indigenous
- Desmodium incanum DC. not indigenous, naturalised
- Desmodium repandum (Vahl) DC. indigenous
- Desmodium salicifolium (Poir.) DC. indigenous
  - Desmodium salicifolium (Poir.) DC. var. salicifolium, indigenous
- Desmodium setigerum (E.Mey.) Benth. ex Harv. indigenous
- Desmodium tortuosum (Sw.) DC. not indigenous, naturalised
- Desmodium uncinatum (Jacq.) DC. not indigenous, cultivated, naturalised, invasive
- Desmodium velutinum (Willd.) DC. indigenous

=== Dialium ===
Genus Dialium:

- Dialium schlechteri Harms, indigenous

=== Dichilus ===
Genus Dichilus:

- Dichilus gracilis Eckl. & Zeyh. indigenous
- Dichilus lebeckioides DC. indigenous
- Dichilus obovatus E.Mey. accepted as Argyrolobium argenteum Eckl. & Zeyh. present
- Dichilus pilosus Conrath ex Schinz, endemic
- Dichilus reflexus (N.E.Br.) A.L.Schutte, indigenous
- Dichilus strictus E.Mey. indigenous

=== Dichrostachys ===
Genus Dichrostachys:

- Dichrostachys cinerea (L.) Wight & Arn. indigenous
  - Dichrostachys cinerea (L.) Wight & Arn. subsp. africana Brenan & Brummitt var. africana, indigenous
  - Dichrostachys cinerea (L.) Wight & Arn. subsp. africana Brenan & Brummitt var. pubescens, indigenous
  - Dichrostachys cinerea (L.) Wight & Arn. subsp. africana Brenan & Brummitt var. setulosa, indigenous
  - Dichrostachys cinerea (L.) Wight & Arn. subsp. nyassana (Taub.) Brenan, indigenous

=== Dipogon ===
Genus Dipogon:

- Dipogon lignosus (L.) Verdc. indigenous

=== Dolicholus ===
Genus Dolicholus:

- Dolicholus totta (Thunb.) Kunze, accepted as Rhynchosia totta (Thunb.) DC. var. totta, indigenous
- Dolicholus venulosus Hiern, accepted as Rhynchosia totta (Thunb.) DC. var. venulosa (Hiern) Verdc. indigenous

=== Dolichos ===
Genus Dolichos:

- Dolichos angustifolius Eckl. & Zeyh. indigenous
- Dolichos angustissimus E.Mey. indigenous
- Dolichos decumbens Thunb. endemic
- Dolichos ensiformis L. accepted as Canavalia ensiformis (L.) DC. indigenous
- Dolichos falciformis E.Mey. indigenous
- Dolichos gladiatus Jacq. accepted as Canavalia gladiata (Jacq.) DC. not indigenous
- Dolichos hastaeformis E.Mey. endemic
- Dolichos junodii (Harms) Verdc. accepted as Nesphostylis junodii (Harms) Munyeny. & F.A.Bisby, indigenous
- Dolichos linearis E.Mey. indigenous
- Dolichos maritimus Aubl. accepted as Canavalia rosea (Sw.) DC.
- Dolichos obtusifolius Lam. accepted as Canavalia rosea (Sw.) DC.
- Dolichos peglerae L.Bolus, endemic
- Dolichos pratensis (E.Mey.) Taub. indigenous
- Dolichos roseus Sw. accepted as Canavalia rosea (Sw.) DC. indigenous
- Dolichos sericeus E.Mey. indigenous
  - Dolichos sericeus E.Mey. subsp. sericeus, indigenous
- Dolichos trilobus L. indigenous
  - Dolichos trilobus L. subsp. transvaalicus Verdc. indigenous
  - Dolichos trilobus L. subsp. trilobus var. trilobus, indigenous
- Dolichos virosus Roxb. accepted as Canavalia africana Dunn

=== Dumasia ===
Genus Dumasia:

- Dumasia villosa DC. indigenous
  - Dumasia villosa DC. var. villosa, indigenous

=== Elephantorrhiza ===
Genus Elephantorrhiza:

- Elephantorrhiza burkei Benth. indigenous
- Elephantorrhiza elephantina (Burch.) Skeels, indigenous
- Elephantorrhiza goetzei (Harms) Harms, indigenous
  - Elephantorrhiza goetzei (Harms) Harms subsp. goetzei, indigenous
- Elephantorrhiza obliqua Burtt Davy, indigenous
  - Elephantorrhiza obliqua Burtt Davy var. glabra E.Phillips, endemic
  - Elephantorrhiza obliqua Burtt Davy var. obliqua, endemic
- Elephantorrhiza praetermissa J.H.Ross, endemic
- Elephantorrhiza woodii E.Phillips, indigenous
  - Elephantorrhiza woodii E.Phillips var. pubescens E.Phillips, indigenous
  - Elephantorrhiza woodii E.Phillips var. woodii, endemic

=== Entada ===
Genus Entada:

- Entada natalensis Benth. indigenous
- Entada rheedei Spreng. indigenous
- Entada wahlbergii Harv. indigenous

=== Enterolobium ===
Genus Enterolobium:

- Enterolobium contortisiliquum (Vell.) Morong, not indigenous, cultivated, naturalised

=== Eriosema ===
Genus Eriosema:

- Eriosema acuminatum (Eckl. & Zeyh.) C.H.Stirt. endemic
- Eriosema angustifolium Burtt Davy, endemic
- Eriosema buchananii Baker f. indigenous
  - Eriosema buchananii Baker f. var. buchananii, endemic
- Eriosema burkei Benth. ex Harv. indigenous
  - Eriosema burkei Benth. ex Harv. var. burkei, indigenous
- Eriosema cordatum E.Mey. indigenous
- Eriosema distinctum N.E.Br. endemic
- Eriosema dregei E.Mey. endemic
- Eriosema durnfordensis C.H.Stirt. endemic
- Eriosema ellipticifolium Schinz, indigenous
- Eriosema fasciculatum Schinz, endemic
- Eriosema gunniae C.H.Stirt. endemic
- Eriosema kraussianum Meisn. indigenous
- Eriosema latifolium (Benth. ex Harv.) C.H.Stirt. endemic
- Eriosema lucipetum C.H.Stirt. indigenous
- Eriosema luteopetalum C.H.Stirt. endemic
- Eriosema naviculare C.H.Stirt. endemic
- Eriosema nutans Schinz, indigenous
- Eriosema parviflorum E.Mey. indigenous
  - Eriosema parviflorum E.Mey. subsp. parviflorum, indigenous
- Eriosema pauciflorum Klotzsch, indigenous
  - Eriosema pauciflorum Klotzsch var. pauciflorum, indigenous
- Eriosema polystachyium E.Mey. accepted as Eriosema psoraleoides (Lam.) G.Don, present
- Eriosema populifolium Benth. ex Harv. indigenous
  - Eriosema populifolium Benth. ex Harv. subsp. capensis C.H.Stirt. & Gordon-Gray, endemic
  - Eriosema populifolium Benth. ex Harv. subsp. populifolium, endemic
- Eriosema preptum C.H.Stirt. endemic
- Eriosema psoraleoides (Lam.) G.Don, indigenous
- Eriosema rossii C.H.Stirt. endemic
- Eriosema salignum E.Mey. indigenous
- Eriosema simulans C.H.Stirt. indigenous
- Eriosema squarrosum (Thunb.) Walp. indigenous
- Eriosema streyi C.H.Stirt. endemic
- Eriosema superpositum C.H.Stirt. endemic
- Eriosema transvaalense C.H.Stirt. indigenous
- Eriosema umtamvunense C.H.Stirt. endemic
- Eriosema x provectum C.H.Stirt. endemic
- Eriosema x woodii C.H.Stirt. endemic
- Eriosema zuluense C.H.Stirt. endemic

=== Erythrina ===
Genus Erythrina:

- Erythrina acanthocarpa E.Mey. endemic
- Erythrina afra Thunb. indigenous
- Erythrina crista-gall L. not indigenous, naturalised
- Erythrina humeana Spreng. indigenous
- Erythrina latissima E.Mey. indigenous
- Erythrina lysistemon Hutch. indigenous
- Erythrina x coddii Barneby & Krukoff, endemic
- Erythrina x dyeri Hennessy, indigenous
- Erythrina x hennessyae Barneby & Krukoff, endemic
- Erythrina x johnsoniae Hennessy, endemic
- Erythrina zeyheri Harv. indigenous

=== Erythrophleum ===
Genus Erythrophleum:

- Erythrophleum lasianthum Corbishley, indigenous

=== Faidherbia ===
Genus Faidherbia:

- Faidherbia albida (Delile) A.Chev. indigenous

=== Flemingia ===
Genus Flemingia:

- Flemingia grahamiana Wight & Arn. indigenous

=== Galactia ===
Genus Galactia:

- Galactia striata (Jacq.) Urb. indigenous
  - Galactia striata (Jacq.) Urb. var. villosa (Wight & Arn.) Verdc. indigenous
- Galactia tenuiflora (Willd.) Wight & Arn. indigenous
  - Galactia tenuiflora (Willd.) Wight & Arn. var. villosa (Wight & Arn.) Benth. accepted as Galactia striata (Jacq.) Urb. var. villosa (Wight & Arn.) Verdc. indigenous
- Galactia villosa Wight & Arn. accepted as Galactia striata (Jacq.) Urb. var. villosa (Wight & Arn.) Verdc.

=== Galega ===
Genus Galega:

- Galega pinnata Thunb. accepted as Rhynchosia ferulifolia (C.Presl) Benth. ex Harv. indigenous

=== Genista ===
Genus Genista:

- Genista monspessulana (L.) L.A.S.Johnson, not indigenous, naturalised, invasive

=== Gleditsia ===
Genus Gleditsia:

- Gleditsia triacanthos L. not indigenous, naturalised, invasive

=== Glycine ===
Genus Glycine:

- Glycine totta Thunb. accepted as Rhynchosia totta (Thunb.) DC. var. totta, indigenous

=== Glycyrrhiza ===
Genus Glycyrrhiza:

- Glycyrrhiza glabra L. not indigenous, naturalised

=== Guibourtia ===
Genus Guibourtia:

- Guibourtia conjugata (Bolle) J.Leonard, indigenous

=== Guilandina ===
Genus Guilandina:

- Guilandina bonduc L. indigenous

=== Hoffmannseggia ===
Genus Hoffmannseggia:

- Hoffmannseggia burchellii (DC.) Benth. ex Oliv. subsp. burchellii, accepted as Pomaria burchellii (DC.) B.B.Simpson & G.P.Lewis subsp. burchellii, indigenous
  - Hoffmannseggia burchellii (DC.) Benth. ex Oliv. subsp. rubro-violacea (Baker f.) Brummitt & J.H.Ross, accepted as Pomaria burchellii (DC.) B.B.Simpson & G.P.Lewis subsp. rubro-violacea (Baker f.) Brummitt, indigenous
- Hoffmannseggia lactea (Schinz) Schinz, accepted as Pomaria lactea (Schinz) B.B.Simpson & G.P.Lewis, indigenous
- Hoffmannseggia sandersonii (Harv.) Engl. accepted as Pomaria sandersonii (Harv.) B.B.Simpson & G.P.Lewis, indigenous

=== Hypocalyptus ===
Genus Hypocalyptus:

- Hypocalyptus coluteoides (Lam.) R.Dahlgren, endemic
- Hypocalyptus oxalidifolius (Sims) Baill. endemic
- Hypocalyptus sophoroides (P.J.Bergius) Baill. endemic

=== Indigastrum ===
Genus Indigastrum:

- Indigastrum argyraeum (Eckl. & Zeyh.) Schrire, indigenousastrum niveum (Willd. ex Spreng.) Schrire & Callm. indigenous
- Indigastrum argyroides (E.Mey.) Schrire, indigenous
- Indigastrum burkeanum (Benth. ex Harv.) Schrire, indigenous
- Indigastrum candidissimum (Dinter) Schrire, indigenous
- Indigastrum costatum (Guill. & Perr.) Schrire, indigenous
  - Indigastrum costatum (Guill. & Perr.) Schrire subsp. macrum (E.Mey.) Schrire, indigenous
  - Indigastrum costatum (Guill. & Perr.) Schrire subsp. theuschii (O.Hoffm.) Schrire, indigenous
- Indigastrum fastigiatum (E.Mey.) Schrire, indigenous
- Indigastrum niveum (Willd. ex Spreng.) Schrire & Callm. indigenous
- Indigastrum parviflorum (B.Heyne ex Wight & Arn.) Schrire, indigenous
  - Indigastrum parviflorum (B.Heyne ex Wight & Arn.) Schrire subsp. parviflorum var. parviflorum, indigenous

=== Indigofera ===
Genus Indigofera:

- Indigofera adenoides Baker f. indigenous
- Indigofera alopecuroides (Burm.f.) DC. indigenous
  - Indigofera alopecuroides (Burm.f.) DC. var. alopecuroides, endemic
  - Indigofera alopecuroides (Burm.f.) DC. var. minor E.Mey. endemic
- Indigofera alpina Eckl. & Zeyh. endemic
- Indigofera alternans DC. indigenous
  - Indigofera alternans DC. var. alternans, indigenous
- Indigofera amitina N.E.Br. indigenous
- Indigofera amoena Aiton, endemic
- Indigofera angustata E.Mey. endemic
- Indigofera angustifolia L., indigenous
  - Indigofera angustifolia L. var. angustifolia, endemic
  - Indigofera angustifolia L. var. tenuifolia (Lam.) Harv. endemic
- Indigofera annua Milne-Redh. accepted as Microcharis annua (Milne-Redh.) Schrire
- Indigofera aquae-nitentis Bremek. indigenous
- Indigofera argyraea Eckl. & Zeyh. accepted as Indigastrum niveum (Willd. ex Spreng.) Schrire & Callm. indigenous
- Indigofera arrecta Hochst. ex A.Rich., indigenous
- Indigofera asantasanensis Schrire & V.R.Clark, endemic
- Indigofera astragalina DC. indigenous
- Indigofera atrata N.E.Br. indigenous
- Indigofera auricoma E.Mey. indigenous
- Indigofera bainesii Baker, indigenous
- Indigofera brachystachya (DC.) E.Mey. endemic
- Indigofera buchananii Burtt Davy, indigenous
- Indigofera burchellii DC. endemic
  - Indigofera burchellii E.Mey. accepted as Indigastrum niveum (Willd. ex Spreng.) Schrire & Callm. indigenous
  - Indigofera burchellii E.Mey. var. multifolia E.Mey. accepted as Indigastrum niveum (Willd. ex Spreng.) Schrire & Callm.
  - Indigofera burchellii E.Mey. var. paucifolia E.Mey. accepted asIndigastrum niveum (Willd. ex Spreng.) Schrire & Callm.
- Indigofera candicans Aiton, endemic
- Indigofera candolleana Meisn. endemic
- Indigofera capillaris Thunb. endemic
- Indigofera charlieriana Schinz, indigenous
  - Indigofera charlieriana Schinz subsp. sessilis (Chiov.) Schrire var. scaberrima, indigenous
  - Indigofera charlieriana Schinz subsp. sessilis (Chiov.) Schrire var. sessilis, indigenous
  - Indigofera charlieriana Schinz var. charlieriana, indigenous
  - Indigofera charlieriana Schinz var. lata J.B.Gillett, indigenous
  - Indigofera charlieriana Schinz var. scaberrima (Schinz) J.B.Gillett, accepted as Indigofera charlieriana Schinz subsp. sessilis (Chiov.) Schrire var. scaberrima, indigenous
- Indigofera circinnata Benth. ex Harv. indigenous
- Indigofera collina Eckl. & Zeyh. accepted as Indigastrum niveum (Willd. ex Spreng.) Schrire & Callm.
- Indigofera colutea (Burm.f.) Merr. indigenous
  - Indigofera colutea (Burm.f.) Merr. var. colutea, indigenous
- Indigofera commixta N.E.Br. endemic
- Indigofera comosa N.E.Br. indigenous
- Indigofera complicata Eckl. & Zeyh. indigenous
- Indigofera concava Harv. endemic
- Indigofera confusa Prain & Baker f. indigenous
- Indigofera crebra N.E.Br. indigenous
- Indigofera cryptantha Benth. ex Harv. indigenous
  - Indigofera cryptantha Benth. ex Harv. var. cryptantha, indigenous
  - Indigofera cryptantha Benth. ex Harv. var. occidentalis Baker f. indigenous
- Indigofera cuneifolia Eckl. & Zeyh. indigenous
  - Indigofera cuneifolia Eckl. & Zeyh. var. angustifolia Harv. endemic
  - Indigofera cuneifolia Eckl. & Zeyh. var. cuneifolia, indigenous
- Indigofera cytisoides (L.) L. endemic
- Indigofera daleoides Benth. ex Harv. indigenous
  - Indigofera daleoides Benth. ex Harv. var. daleoides, indigenous
  - Indigofera daleoides Benth. ex Harv. var. gossweileri Baker f. indigenous
- Indigofera damarana Merxm. & A.Schreib. indigenous
- Indigofera declinata E.Mey. endemic
- Indigofera decora Lindl. not indigenous, naturalised
- Indigofera delagoaensis Baker f. ex J.B.Gillett, indigenous
- Indigofera densa N.E.Br. indigenous
- Indigofera denudata L.f., endemic
- Indigofera depressa Harv. endemic
- Indigofera digitata Thunb. endemic
- Indigofera dillwynioides Benth. ex Harv. endemic
- Indigofera dimidiata Vogel ex Walp. indigenous
- Indigofera disticha Eckl. & Zeyh. endemic
- Indigofera dolichothyrsa Baker f. indigenous
- Indigofera dregeana E.Mey. indigenous
- Indigofera egens N.E.Br. endemic
- Indigofera elandsbergensis Phillipson, endemic
- Indigofera enormis N.E.Br. indigenous
- Indigofera erecta Thunb., endemic
- Indigofera eriocarpa E.Mey. indigenous
- Indigofera evansiana Burtt Davy, indigenous
- Indigofera evansii Schltr. endemic
- Indigofera exigua Eckl. & Zeyh. endemic
- Indigofera filicaulis Eckl. & Zeyh. endemic
- Indigofera filifolia Thunb., endemic
- Indigofera filiformis L.f. endemic
- Indigofera filipes Benth. ex Harv. indigenous
- Indigofera flabellata Harv. endemic
- Indigofera flavicans Baker, indigenous
- Indigofera floribunda N.E.Br. endemic
- Indigofera foliosa E.Mey. endemic
- Indigofera frondosa N.E.Br. indigenous
- Indigofera frutescens L.f. endemic
- Indigofera fulcrata Harv. endemic
- Indigofera galpinii N.E.Br. indigenous
- Indigofera gifbergensis C.H.Stirt. & Jarvie, endemic
- Indigofera glaucescens Eckl. & Zeyh. endemic
- Indigofera glomerata E.Mey. endemic
- Indigofera gracilis Spreng. endemic
- Indigofera grata E.Mey. endemic
- Indigofera grisophylla Fourc. endemic
- Indigofera guthriei Bolus, endemic
- Indigofera hamulosa Schltr. endemic
- Indigofera hantamensis Diels, endemic
- Indigofera hedyantha Eckl. & Zeyh. indigenous
  - Indigofera hedyantha Eckl. & Zeyh. subsp. hedyantha, indigenous
  - Indigofera hedyantha Eckl. & Zeyh. subsp. inyangana (N.E.Br.) Schrire, indigenous
  - Indigofera hedyantha Eckl. & Zeyh. subsp. robusta Schrire, indigenous
- Indigofera hendecaphylla Jacq. indigenous
- Indigofera heterantha Wall. ex Brandis, not indigenous, naturalised
- Indigofera heterophylla Thunb. endemic
- Indigofera heterotricha DC., indigenous
  - Indigofera heterotricha DC. subsp. heterotricha, indigenous
  - Indigofera heterotricha DC. subsp. pechuelii (Kuntze) Schrire, indigenous
- Indigofera hilaris Eckl. & Zeyh. indigenous
  - Indigofera hilaris Eckl. & Zeyh. var. hilaris, indigenous
- Indigofera hirsuta L. indigenous
  - Indigofera hirsuta L. var. hirsuta, indigenous
- Indigofera hispida Eckl. & Zeyh. endemic
- Indigofera hochstetteri Baker, indigenous
  - Indigofera hochstetteri Baker subsp. streyana (Merxm.) A.Schreib. indigenous
- Indigofera hololeuca Benth. ex Harv. indigenous
- Indigofera holubii N.E.Br. indigenous
- Indigofera homblei Baker f. & Martin, indigenous
  - Indigofera homblei Baker f. & Martin subsp. homblei, indigenous
- Indigofera humifusa Eckl. & Zeyh. endemic
- Indigofera hybrida N.E.Br. endemic
- Indigofera incana Thunb. endemic
- Indigofera ingrata N.E.Br. indigenous
- Indigofera inhambanensis Klotzsch, indigenous
- Indigofera inyangana N.E.Br. accepted as Indigofera hedyantha Eckl. & Zeyh. subsp. inyangana (N.E.Br.) Schrire, endemic
- Indigofera ionii Jarvie & C.H.Stirt. endemic
- Indigofera jucunda Schrire, endemic
- Indigofera krookii Schltr. ex Zahlbr. endemic
- Indigofera langebergensis L.Bolus, endemic
- Indigofera laxeracemosa Baker f. indigenous
- Indigofera leendertziae N.E.Br. endemic
- Indigofera lepida N.E.Br. endemic
- Indigofera leptocarpa Eckl. & Zeyh. endemic
- Indigofera limosa L.Bolus, endemic
- Indigofera longebarbata Engl. accepted as Indigofera longibarbata Engl. present
  - Indigofera longibarbata Engl. indigenous
- Indigofera lupatana Baker f. indigenous
- Indigofera lyallii Baker, indigenous
  - Indigofera lyallii Baker subsp. lyallii, indigenous
- Indigofera lydenbergensis N.E.Br. indigenous
  - Indigofera lydenburgensis N.E.Br. indigenous
- Indigofera magnifica Schrire & V.R.Clark, endemic
- Indigofera maritima Baker, indigenous
- Indigofera masonae N.E.Br. endemic
- Indigofera mauritanica (L.) Thunb. endemic
  - Indigofera mauritanica (L.) Thunb. var. hirta Harv. accepted as Indigofera candolleana Meisn. present
- Indigofera melanadenia Benth. ex Harv. indigenous
- Indigofera meyeriana Eckl. & Zeyh. endemic
- Indigofera micrantha E.Mey. indigenous
- Indigofera mimosoides Baker, indigenous
  - Indigofera mimosoides Baker var. mimosoides, indigenous
- Indigofera mischocarpa Schltr. endemic
- Indigofera mollicoma N.E.Br. indigenous
- Indigofera mollis Eckl. & Zeyh., endemic
- Indigofera monostachya Eckl. & Zeyh. endemic
- Indigofera mundiana Eckl. & Zeyh. endemic
- Indigofera natalensis Bolus, endemic
- Indigofera nebrowniana J.B.Gillett, indigenous
- Indigofera neglecta N.E.Br. indigenous
- Indigofera nigromontana Eckl. & Zeyh. indigenous
- Indigofera nivea Willd. ex Spreng. accepted as Indigastrum niveum (Willd. ex Spreng.) Schrire & Callm. indigenous
- Indigofera nudicaulis E.Mey. indigenous
- Indigofera obcordata Eckl. & Zeyh. endemic
- Indigofera obscura N.E.Br. indigenous
- Indigofera ormocarpoides Baker, indigenous
- Indigofera ovata Thunb. endemic
- Indigofera ovina Harv. endemic
- Indigofera oxalidea Welw. ex Baker, indigenous
- Indigofera oxytropis Benth. ex Harv. indigenous
- Indigofera pappei Fourc. endemic
- Indigofera pauciflora Eckl. & Zeyh., indigenous
- Indigofera pechuelii Kuntze, accepted as Indigofera heterotricha DC. subsp. pechuelii (Kuntze) Schrire, indigenous
- Indigofera placida N.E.Br. indigenous
- Indigofera platypoda E.Mey. endemic
- Indigofera podophylla Benth. ex Harv. indigenous
- Indigofera poliotes Eckl. & Zeyh. endemic
- Indigofera pongolana N.E.Br. endemic
- Indigofera porrecta Eckl. & Zeyh. indigenous
  - Indigofera porrecta Eckl. & Zeyh. var. bicolor Harv. endemic
- Indigofera porrecta Eckl. & Zeyh. var. porrecta, indigenous
- Indigofera praticola Baker f. indigenous
- Indigofera procumbens L., endemic
- Indigofera pseudoevansii Hilliard & B.L.Burtt, endemic
- Indigofera psoraloides (L.) L. endemic
- Indigofera pungens E.Mey. indigenous
- Indigofera quinquefolia E.Mey. endemic
- Indigofera racemosa L. indigenous
- Indigofera reducta N.E.Br. indigenous
- Indigofera rehmannii Baker f. endemic
- Indigofera rhodantha Fourc. indigenous
- Indigofera rhytidocarpa Benth. ex Harv. indigenous
  - Indigofera rhytidocarpa Benth. ex Harv. subsp. rhytidocarpa, indigenous
- Indigofera ripae N.E.Br. endemic
- Indigofera rostrata Bolus, indigenous
  - Indigofera rostrata Bolus subsp. rostrata, indigenous
- Indigofera rubroglandulosa Germish. endemic
- Indigofera sanguinea N.E.Br. indigenous
- Indigofera sarmentosa L.f. endemic
- Indigofera schimperi Jaub. & Spach, indigenous
  - Indigofera schimperi Jaub. & Spach var. baukeana (Vatke) J.B.Gillett, indigenous
  - Indigofera schimperi Jaub. & Spach var. schimperi, indigenous
- Indigofera schinzii N.E.Br. indigenous
- Indigofera sessilifolia DC. indigenous
- Indigofera setiflora Baker, indigenous
- Indigofera setosa N.E.Br. endemic
- Indigofera sordida Benth. ex Harv. indigenous
- Indigofera soutpansbergensis Schrire, indigenous
- Indigofera spicata Forssk. indigenous
  - Indigofera spicata Forssk. var. spicata, indigenous
- Indigofera stricta L.f. endemic
- Indigofera subcorymbosa Baker, indigenous
  - Indigofera subcorymbosa Baker var. eylesii Baker f. accepted as Indigofera subcorymbosa Baker var. subcorymbosa, present
  - Indigofera subcorymbosa Baker var. subcorymbosa, endemic
- Indigofera subulata Vahl ex Poir. var. scabra (Roth) Meikle, indigenous
  - Indigofera subulata Vahl ex Poir. var. subulata, indigenous
- Indigofera sulcata DC. endemic
- Indigofera superba C.H.Stirt. endemic
- Indigofera swaziensis Bolus, indigenous
  - Indigofera swaziensis Bolus var. perplexa (N.E.Br.) J.B.Gillett, indigenous
  - Indigofera swaziensis Bolus var. swaziensis, indigenous
- Indigofera tenuissima E.Mey. indigenous
- Indigofera thesioides Jarvie & C.H.Stirt. endemic
- Indigofera tinctoria L. indigenous
  - Indigofera tinctoria L. var. arcuata J.B.Gillett, indigenous
- Indigofera tomentosa Eckl. & Zeyh. endemic
- Indigofera torulosa E.Mey., indigenous
  - Indigofera torulosa E.Mey. var. angustiloba (Baker f.) J.B.Gillett, endemic
  - Indigofera torulosa E.Mey. var. torulosa, indigenous
- Indigofera trifolioides Baker f. endemic
- Indigofera triquetra E.Mey. endemic
- Indigofera tristis E.Mey. indigenous
- Indigofera tristoides N.E.Br. indigenous
- Indigofera trita L.f. indigenous
  - Indigofera trita L.f. subsp. scabra (Roth) de Kort & G.Thijsse, accepted as Indigofera subulata Vahl ex Poir. var. scabra (Roth) Meikle, indigenous
  - Indigofera trita L.f. subsp. subulata (Vahl ex Poir.) Ali, accepted as Indigofera subulata Vahl ex Poir. indigenous
  - Indigofera trita L.f. var. scabra (Roth) Ali, accepted as Indigofera subulata Vahl ex Poir. var. scabra (Roth) Meikle, present
  - Indigofera trita L.f. var. subulata (Vahl ex Poir.) Ali, accepted as Indigofera subulata Vahl ex Poir. present
- Indigofera velutina E.Mey. indigenous
- Indigofera venusta Eckl. & Zeyh. endemic
- Indigofera verrucosa Eckl. & Zeyh. endemic
- Indigofera vicioides Jaub. & Spach, indigenous
  - Indigofera vicioides Jaub. & Spach var. rogersii (R.E.Fr.) J.B.Gillett, indigenous
  - Indigofera vicioides Jaub. & Spach var. vicioides, indigenous
- Indigofera williamsonii (Harv.) N.E.Br. indigenous
- Indigofera woodii Bolus, indigenous
  - Indigofera woodii Bolus var. laxa Bolus, endemic
  - Indigofera woodii Bolus var. woodii, endemic
- Indigofera zeyheri Spreng. ex Eckl. & Zeyh. indigenous

=== Kotschya ===
Genus Kotschya:

- Kotschya parvifolia (Burtt Davy) Verdc. indigenous
- Kotschya thymodora (Baker f.) Wild subsp. thymodora, indigenous

=== Lablab ===
Genus Lablab:

- Lablab purpureus (L.) Sweet, indigenous
  - Lablab purpureus (L.) Sweet subsp. purpureus, not indigenous, naturalised
  - Lablab purpureus (L.) Sweet subsp. uncinatus Verdc. indigenous

=== Lathyrus ===
Genus Lathyrus:

- Lathyrus latifolius L. not indigenous, cultivated, naturalised, invasive

=== Lebeckia ===
Genus Lebeckia:

- Lebeckia acanthoclada Dinter, accepted as Calobota acanthoclada (Dinter) Boatwr. & B.-E.van Wyk, indigenous
- Lebeckia ambigua E.Mey. endemic
- Lebeckia bowieana Benth. accepted as Wiborgiella bowieana (Benth.) Boatwr. & B.-E.van Wyk, endemic
- Lebeckia brevicarpa M.M.le Roux & B.-E.van Wyk, endemic
- Lebeckia brevipes M.M.le Roux & B.-E.van Wyk, endemic
- Lebeckia carnosa (E.Mey.) Druce, accepted as Lebeckia contaminata (L.) Thunb., endemic
- Lebeckia cinerea E.Mey. accepted as Calobota cinerea (E.Mey.) Boatwr. & B.-E.van Wyk, indigenous
- Lebeckia contaminata (L.) Thunb., endemic
- Lebeckia cytisoides (Berg.) Thunb. accepted as Calobota cytisoides (Berg.) Eckl. & Zeyh. endemic
- Lebeckia dinteri Harms, accepted as Calobota linearifolia (E.Mey.) Boatwr. & B.-E.van Wyk
- Lebeckia fasciculata Benth. accepted as Wiborgiella fasciculata (Benth.) Boatwr. & B.-E.van Wyk, endemic
- Lebeckia gracilis Eckl. & Zeyh. endemic
- Lebeckia grandiflora Benth. endemic
- Lebeckia halenbergensis Merxm. & A.Schreib. accepted as Calobota halenbergensis (Merxm. & Schreib.) Boatwr. & B.-E.van Wyk, present
- Lebeckia inflata Bolus, accepted as Wiborgiella inflata (Bolus) Boatwr. & B.-E.van Wyk, endemic
- Lebeckia leipoldtiana Schltr. ex R.Dahlgren, accepted as Wiborgiella leipoldtiana (Schltr. ex R.Dahlgren) Boatwr. & B.-E.van Wyk, endemic
- Lebeckia leptophylla Benth. accepted as Wiborgiella mucronata (Benth.) Boatwr. & B.-E.van Wyk, endemic
- Lebeckia linearifolia E.Mey. accepted as Calobota linearifolia (E.Mey.) Boatwr. & B.-E.van Wyk, indigenous
- Lebeckia longipes Bolus, endemic
- Lebeckia lotononoides Schltr. accepted as Calobota lotononoides (Schltr.) Boatwr. & B.-E.van Wyk, endemic
- Lebeckia macowanii T.M.Salter, accepted as Lebeckia meyeriana Eckl. & Zeyh. endemic
- Lebeckia macrantha Harv. accepted as Calobota cuspidosa (Burch.) Boatwr. & B.-E.van Wyk, indigenous
- Lebeckia melilotoides R.Dahlgren, accepted as Calobota elongata (Thunb.) Boatwr. & B.-E.van Wyk, endemic
- Lebeckia meyeriana Eckl. & Zeyh. endemic
- Lebeckia microphylla E.Mey. accepted as Lotononis caerulescens (E.Mey.) B.-E.van Wyk, present
- Lebeckia mucronata Benth. accepted as Wiborgiella mucronata (Benth.) Boatwr. & B.-E.van Wyk, endemic
- Lebeckia multiflora E.Mey. accepted as Calobota angustifolia (E.Mey.) Boatwr. & B.-E.van Wyk, indigenous
- Lebeckia obovata Schinz, accepted as Calobota obovata (Schinz) Boatwr. & B.-E.van Wyk
- Lebeckia parvifolia (Schinz) Harms, accepted as Calobota angustifolia (E.Mey.) Boatwr. & B.-E.van Wyk, present
- Lebeckia pauciflora Eckl. & Zeyh. endemic
- Lebeckia plukenetiana E.Mey. endemic
- Lebeckia psiloloba (E.Mey.) Walp. accepted as Calobota psiloloba (E.Mey.) Boatwr. & B.-E.van Wyk, endemic
- Lebeckia pungens Thunb. accepted as Calobota pungens (Thunb.) Boatwr. & B.-E.van Wyk, present
- Lebeckia sepiaria (L.) Thunb., endemic
- Lebeckia sericea Thunb. accepted as Calobota sericea (Thunb.) Boatwr. & B.-E.van Wyk, endemic
- Lebeckia sessilifolia (Eckl. & Zeyh.) Benth. accepted as Wiborgiella sessilifolia (Eckl. & Zeyh.) Boatwr. & B.-E.van Wyk, endemic
- Lebeckia simsiana Eckl. & Zeyh. accepted as Lebeckia sepiaria (L.) Thunb., endemic
- Lebeckia spinescens Harv. accepted as Calobota spinescens (Harv.) Boatwr. & B.-E.van Wyk, indigenous
- Lebeckia uniflora B.-E.van Wyk & M.M.le Roux, endemic
- Lebeckia wrightii (Harv.) Bolus, endemic
- Lebeckia zeyheri M.M.le Roux & B.-E.van Wyk, endemic

=== Leobordea ===
Genus Leobordea:

- Leobordea acuticarpa (B.-E.van Wyk) B.-E.van Wyk & Boatwr. endemic
- Leobordea adpressa (N.E.Br.) B.-E.van Wyk & Boatwr. accepted as Leobordea acuticarpa (B.-E.van Wyk) B.-E.van Wyk & Boatwr. indigenous
  - Leobordea adpressa (N.E.Br.) B.-E.van Wyk & Boatwr. subsp. adpressa, indigenous
  - Leobordea adpressa (N.E.Br.) B.-E.van Wyk & Boatwr. subsp. leptantha (B.-E.van Wyk) B.-E.van Wyk, endemic
- Leobordea anthylloides (Harv.) B.-E.van Wyk & Boatwr. accepted as Leobordea sutherlandii (Dummer) B.-E.van Wyk & Boatwr. present
- Leobordea arida (Dummer) B.-E.van Wyk & Boatwr. endemic
- Leobordea benthamiana (Dummer) B.-E.van Wyk & Boatwr. endemic
- Leobordea carinata (E.Mey.) B.-E.van Wyk & Boatwr. indigenous
- Leobordea corymbosa (E.Mey.) B.-E.van Wyk & Boatwr. indigenous
- Leobordea decumbens (Thunb.) B.-E.van Wyk & Boatwr. indigenous
  - Leobordea decumbens (Thunb.) B.-E.van Wyk & Boatwr. subsp. decumbens, endemic
  - Leobordea decumbens (Thunb.) B.-E.van Wyk & Boatwr. subsp. rehmannii (Dummer) B.-E.van Wyk, indigenous
- Leobordea difformis (B.-E.van Wyk) B.-E.van Wyk & Boatwr. endemic
- Leobordea diffusa B.-E.van Wyk & Boatwr. accepted as Leobordea rosea (Dummer) L.A.Silva & J.Freitas, endemic
- Leobordea digitata (Harv.) B.-E.van Wyk & Boatwr. endemic
- Leobordea divaricata Eckl. & Zeyh. indigenous
- Leobordea eriantha (Benth.) B.-E.van Wyk & Boatwr. indigenous
- Leobordea esterhuyseana (B.-E.van Wyk) B.-E.van Wyk & Boatwr. endemic
- Leobordea foliosa (Bolus) B.-E.van Wyk & Boatwr. indigenous
- Leobordea furcata (Merxm. & A.Schreib.) B.-E.van Wyk & Boatwr., accepted as Leobordea furcata (Merxm. & A.Schreib.) L.A.Silva & J.Freitas, indigenous
- Leobordea furcata (Merxm. & A.Schreib.) L.A.Silva & J.Freitas, indigenous
- Leobordea globulosa (B.-E.van Wyk) B.-E.van Wyk & Boatwr. endemic
- Leobordea grandis (Dummer) B.-E.van Wyk & Boatwr. endemic
- Leobordea hirsuta (Schinz) B.-E.van Wyk & Boatwr. endemic
- Leobordea lanata (Thunb.) B.-E.van Wyk & Boatwr. endemic
- Leobordea lanceolata (E.Mey.) B.-E.van Wyk & Boatwr. indigenous
- Leobordea laticeps (B.-E.van Wyk) B.-E.van Wyk & Boatwr. endemic
- Leobordea longicephala (B.-E.van Wyk) B.-E.van Wyk & Boatwr. endemic
- Leobordea longiflora (Bolus) B.-E.van Wyk & Boatwr. endemic
- Leobordea magnifica (B.-E.van Wyk) B.-E.van Wyk & Boatwr. endemic
- Leobordea mollis (E.Mey.) B.-E.van Wyk & Boatwr. endemic
- Leobordea mucronata (Conrath) B.-E.van Wyk & Boatwr. indigenous
- Leobordea oligocephala (B.-E.van Wyk) B.-E.van Wyk & Boatwr. endemic
- Leobordea pariflora (N.E.Br.) B.-E.van Wyk & Boatwr. endemic
- Leobordea pentaphylla (E.Mey.) B.-E.van Wyk & Boatwr. endemic
- Leobordea platycarpa (Viv.) B.-E.van Wyk & Boatwr. indigenous
- Leobordea plicata (B.-E.van Wyk) B.-E.van Wyk & Boatwr. endemic
- Leobordea polycephala (E.Mey.) B.-E.van Wyk & Boatwr. endemic
- Leobordea procumbens (Bolus) B.-E.van Wyk & Boatwr. indigenous
- Leobordea prolifera (E.Mey.) Eckl. & Zeyh. endemic
- Leobordea pulchra (Dummer) B.-E.van Wyk & Boatwr. indigenous
- Leobordea pusilla (Dummer) B.-E.van Wyk & Boatwr. endemic
- Leobordea quinata (E.Mey.) B.-E.van Wyk & Boatwr. endemic
- Leobordea rosea (Dummer) L.A.Silva & J.Freitas, endemic
- Leobordea stipulosa (Baker f.) B.-E.van Wyk & Boatwr. indigenous
- Leobordea sutherlandii (Dummer) B.-E.van Wyk & Boatwr. endemic

=== Lespedeza ===
Genus Lespedeza:

- Lespedeza cuneata (Dum.Cours.) G.Don, not indigenous, naturalised

=== Lessertia ===
Genus Lessertia:

- Lessertia affinis Burtt Davy, endemic
- Lessertia amajubica T.Nkonki, endemic
- Lessertia annularis Burch. indigenous
- Lessertia argentea Harv. endemic
- Lessertia benguellensis Baker f. indigenous
- Lessertia brachypus Harv. indigenous
- Lessertia brachystachya DC. indigenous
- Lessertia candida E.Mey. indigenous
- Lessertia canescens Goldblatt & J.C.Manning, endemic
- Lessertia capensis (P.J.Bergius) Druce, endemic
- Lessertia capitata E.Mey. indigenous
- Lessertia carnosa Eckl. & Zeyh. endemic
- Lessertia contracta M.Balkwill, endemic
- Lessertia depressa Harv. indigenous
- Lessertia diffusa R.Br. indigenous
- Lessertia dykei L.Bolus, endemic
- Lessertia excisa DC. endemic
- Lessertia falciformis DC. indigenous
- Lessertia flanaganii L.Bolus, endemic
- Lessertia flexuosa E.Mey. endemic
- Lessertia frutescens (L.) Goldblatt & J.C.Manning, indigenous
  - Lessertia frutescens (L.) Goldblatt & J.C.Manning subsp. frutescens, indigenous
  - Lessertia frutescens (L.) Goldblatt & J.C.Manning subsp. microphylla (Burch. ex DC.) J.C.Manning & B, indigenous
  - Lessertia frutescens (L.) Goldblatt & J.C.Manning subsp. speciosa (E.Phillips & R.A.Dyer) J.C.Mannin, endemic
- Lessertia fruticosa Lindl. endemic
- Lessertia globosa L.Bolus, endemic
- Lessertia harveyana L.Bolus, endemic
- Lessertia herbacea (L.) Druce, indigenous
- Lessertia humilis (E.Phillips & R.A.Dyer) Goldblatt & J.C.Manning, accepted as Lessertia frutescens (L.) Goldblatt & J.C.Manning subsp. frutescens, endemic
- Lessertia incana Schinz, indigenous
- Lessertia inflata Harv. endemic
- Lessertia ingeliensis M.Balkwill, endemic
- Lessertia kensitii L.Bolus, endemic
- Lessertia lanata Harv. endemic
- Lessertia macroflora M.Balkwill, indigenous
- Lessertia macrostachya DC. indigenous
  - Lessertia macrostachya DC. var. macrostachya, indigenous
- Lessertia margaritacea E.Mey. endemic
- Lessertia meyeri Boatwr. T.Nkonki & B.-E.van Wyk, indigenous
- Lessertia microcarpa E.Mey. endemic
- Lessertia microphylla (Burch. ex DC.) Goldblatt & J.C.Manning, accepted as Lessertia frutescens (L.) Goldblatt & J.C.Manning subsp. microphylla (Burch. ex DC.) J.C.Manning & B, indigenous
- Lessertia miniata T.M.Salter, endemic
- Lessertia montana (E.Phillips & R.A.Dyer) Goldblatt & J.C.Manning, accepted as Lessertia frutescens (L.) Goldblatt & J.C.Manning subsp. frutescens, indigenous
- Lessertia mossii R.G.N.Young, endemic
- Lessertia muricata T.M.Salter, endemic
- Lessertia pappeana Harv. endemic
- Lessertia parviflora Harv. endemic
- Lessertia pauciflora Harv. indigenous
  - Lessertia pauciflora Harv. var. pauciflora, indigenous
  - Lessertia pauciflora Harv. var. schlechteri L.Bolus, indigenous
- Lessertia perennans (Jacq.) DC. indigenous
  - Lessertia perennans (Jacq.) DC. var. perennans, indigenous
  - Lessertia perennans (Jacq.) DC. var. polystachya (Harv.) L.Bolus, indigenous
  - Lessertia perennans (Jacq.) DC. var. sericea L.Bolus, endemic
- Lessertia phillipsiana Burtt Davy, endemic
- Lessertia physodes Eckl. & Zeyh. endemic
- Lessertia prostata DC. indigenous
- Lessertia rigida E.Mey. endemic
- Lessertia sneeuwbergensis Germish. endemic
- Lessertia speciosa (E.Phillips & R.A.Dyer) Goldblatt & J.C.Manning, accepted as Lessertia frutescens (L.) Goldblatt & J.C.Manning subsp. speciosa (E.Phillips & R.A.Dyer) J.C.Mannin, endemic
- Lessertia spinescens E.Mey. endemic
- Lessertia stenoloba E.Mey. endemic
- Lessertia stipulata Baker f., indigenous
- Lessertia stricta L.Bolus, indigenous
- Lessertia subumbellata Harv. endemic
- Lessertia tenuifolia E.Mey. endemic
- Lessertia thodei L.Bolus, indigenous
- Lessertia tomentosa DC. endemic

=== Leucaena ===
Genus Leucaena:

- Leucaena latisiliqua (L.) Gillis, accepted as Lysiloma latisiliquum (L.) Benth. not indigenous, naturalised
- Leucaena leucocephala (Lam.) de Wit, not indigenous, naturalised, invasive
  - Leucaena leucocephala (Lam.) de Wit subsp. leucocephala, not indigenous, naturalised

=== Liparia ===
Genus Liparia:

- Liparia angustifolia (Eckl. & Zeyh.) A.L.Schutte, endemic
- Liparia bonaespei A.L.Schutte, endemic
- Liparia boucheri (E.G.H.Oliv. & Fellingham) A.L.Schutte, endemic
- Liparia calycina (L.Bolus) A.L.Schutte, endemic
- Liparia capitata Thunb. endemic
- Liparia confusa A.L.Schutte, endemic
- Liparia congesta A.L.Schutte, endemic
- Liparia genistoides (Lam.) A.L.Schutte, endemic
- Liparia graminifolia L. endemic
- Liparia hirsuta Thunb. endemic
- Liparia laevigata (L.) Thunb. (synonym Borbonia laevigata L.), endemic
- Liparia latifolia (Benth.) A.L.Schutte, endemic
- Liparia myrtifolia Thunb. endemic
- Liparia parva Vogel ex Walp. endemic
- Liparia racemosa A.L.Schutte, endemic
- Liparia rafnioides A.L.Schutte, endemic
- Liparia sphaerica L. accepted as Liparia splendens (Burm.f.) Bos & de Wit subsp. splendens, present
- Liparia splendens (Burm.f.) Bos & de Wit, indigenous
  - Liparia splendens (Burm.f.) Bos & de Wit subsp. comantha (Eckl. & Zeyh.) Bos & de Wit, endemic
  - Liparia splendens (Burm.f.) Bos & de Wit subsp. splendens, endemic
- Liparia striata A.L.Schutte, endemic
- Liparia umbellifera Thunb. endemic
- Liparia vestita Thunb. endemic

=== Lipozygis ===
Genus Lipozygis:

- Lipozygis quinata E.Mey. accepted as Leobordea quinata (E.Mey.) B.-E.van Wyk & Boatwr. indigenous

=== Listia ===
Genus Listia:

- Listia bainesii (Baker) B.-E.van Wyk & Boatwr. indigenous
- Listia heterophylla E.Mey. indigenous
- Listia marlothii (Engl.) B.-E.van Wyk & Boatwr. indigenous
- Listia minima (B.-E.van Wyk) B.-E.van Wyk & Boatwr. endemic
- Listia solitudinis (Dummer) B.-E.van Wyk & Boatwr. endemic
- Listia subulata (B.-E.van Wyk) B.-E.van Wyk & Boatwr. endemic

=== Lonchocarpus ===
Genus Lonchocarpus:

- Lonchocarpus bussei Harms, accepted as Philenoptera bussei (Harms) Schrire, indigenous
- Lonchocarpus capassa Rolfe, accepted as Philenoptera violacea (Klotzsch) Schrire, indigenous
- Lonchocarpus sutherlandii (Harv.) Dunn, accepted as Philenoptera sutherlandii (Harv.) Schrire, indigenous
- Lonchocarpus violaceus (Klotzsch) Oliv., accepted as Philenoptera violacea (Klotzsch) Schrire, indigenous
- Lonchocarpus zimmermannii Harms, accepted as Craibia zimmermannii (Harms) Dunn

=== Lotononis ===
Genus Lotononis:

- Lotononis acocksii B.-E.van Wyk, endemic
- Lotononis acuminata Eckl. & Zeyh. endemic
- Lotononis acuticarpa B.-E.van Wyk, accepted as Leobordea acuticarpa (B.-E.van Wyk) B.-E.van Wyk & Boatwr. endemic
- Lotononis acutiflora Benth. endemic
- Lotononis adpressa N.E.Br. subsp. adpressa, accepted as Leobordea adpressa (N.E.Br.) B.-E.van Wyk & Boatwr. subsp. adpressa, indigenous
  - Lotononis adpressa N.E.Br. subsp. leptantha B.-E.van Wyk, accepted as Leobordea adpressa (N.E.Br.) B.-E.van Wyk & Boatwr. subsp. leptantha (B.-E.van Wyk) B.-E.van Wyk, endemic
- Lotononis affinis Burtt Davy, accepted as Leobordea mucronata (Conrath) B.-E.van Wyk & Boatwr. present
- Lotononis alpina (Eckl. & Zeyh.) B.-E.van Wyk, indigenous
  - Lotononis alpina (Eckl. & Zeyh.) B.-E.van Wyk subsp. alpina, endemic
  - Lotononis alpina (Eckl. & Zeyh.) B.-E.van Wyk subsp. multiflora (Eckl. & Zeyh.) B.-E.van Wyk, endemic
- Lotononis amajubica (Burtt Davy) B.-E.van Wyk, endemic
- Lotononis anthyllopsis B.-E.van Wyk, endemic
- Lotononis arenicola Schltr. endemic
- Lotononis argentea Eckl. & Zeyh. endemic
- Lotononis arida Dummer, accepted as Leobordea arida (Dummer) B.-E.van Wyk & Boatwr. endemic
- Lotononis azurea (Eckl. & Zeyh.) Benth. endemic
- Lotononis azureoides B.-E.van Wyk, endemic
- Lotononis bachmanniana Dummer, endemic
- Lotononis bainesii Baker, accepted as Listia bainesii (Baker) B.-E.van Wyk & Boatwr. indigenous
- Lotononis benthamiana Dummer, accepted as Leobordea benthamiana (Dummer) B.-E.van Wyk & Boatwr. endemic
- Lotononis bolusii Dummer, accepted as Leobordea lanata (Thunb.) B.-E.van Wyk & Boatwr. endemic
- Lotononis brachyantha Harms, indigenous
- Lotononis bracteosa B.-E.van Wyk, accepted as Leobordea bracteosa (B.-E.van Wyk) B.-E.van Wyk & Boatwr.
- Lotononis brevicaulis B.-E.van Wyk, endemic
- Lotononis burchellii Benth. endemic
- Lotononis caerulescens (E.Mey.) B.-E.van Wyk, endemic
- Lotononis calycina (E.Mey.) Benth. accepted as Leobordea divaricata Eckl. & Zeyh. indigenous
- Lotononis carinata (E.Mey.) Benth. accepted as Leobordea carinata (E.Mey.) B.-E.van Wyk & Boatwr. present
- Lotononis carnea B.-E.van Wyk, endemic
- Lotononis carnosa (Eckl. & Zeyh.) Benth. indigenous
  - Lotononis carnosa (Eckl. & Zeyh.) Benth. subsp. carnosa, endemic
  - Lotononis carnosa (Eckl. & Zeyh.) Benth. subsp. condensata (Harv.) B.-E.van Wyk, endemic
  - Lotononis carnosa (Eckl. & Zeyh.) Benth. subsp. latifolia B.-E.van Wyk, endemic
- Lotononis complanata B.-E.van Wyk, endemic
- Lotononis comptonii B.-E.van Wyk, endemic
- Lotononis corymbosa (E.Mey.) Benth. accepted as Leobordea corymbosa (E.Mey.) B.-E.van Wyk & Boatwr. indigenous
- Lotononis crumanina Burch. ex Benth. indigenous
- Lotononis curtii Harms, indigenous
- Lotononis dahlgrenii B.-E.van Wyk, endemic
- Lotononis decumbens (Thunb.) B.-E.van Wyk, indigenous
  - Lotononis decumbens (Thunb.) B.-E.van Wyk subsp. decumbens, endemic
  - Lotononis decumbens (Thunb.) B.-E.van Wyk subsp. rehmannii (Dummer) B.-E.van Wyk, indigenous
- Lotononis delicatula Bolus ex De Wild. accepted as Leobordea quinata (E.Mey.) B.-E.van Wyk & Boatwr. indigenous
- Lotononis densa (Thunb.) Harv. indigenous
  - Lotononis densa (Thunb.) Harv. subsp. congesta B.-E.van Wyk, endemic
  - Lotononis densa (Thunb.) Harv. subsp. densa, endemic
  - Lotononis densa (Thunb.) Harv. subsp. gracilis (E.Mey.) B.-E.van Wyk, endemic
  - Lotononis densa (Thunb.) Harv. subsp. leucoclada (Schltr.) B.-E.van Wyk, endemic
- Lotononis dichiloides Sond. endemic
- Lotononis difformis B.-E.van Wyk, accepted as Leobordea difformis (B.-E.van Wyk) B.-E.van Wyk & Boatwr. endemic
- Lotononis digitata Harv. accepted as Leobordea digitata (Harv.) B.-E.van Wyk & Boatwr. endemic
- Lotononis dissitinodis B.-E.van Wyk, endemic
- Lotononis divaricata (Eckl. & Zeyh.) Benth. indigenous
- Lotononis elongata (Thunb.) D.Dietr. endemic
- Lotononis eriantha Benth. accepted as Leobordea eriantha (Benth.) B.-E.van Wyk & Boatwr. indigenous
- Lotononis eriocarpa (E.Mey.) B.-E.van Wyk, indigenous
- Lotononis esterhuyseniana B.-E.van Wyk, accepted as Leobordea esterhuyseana (B.-E.van Wyk) B.-E.van Wyk & Boatwr. endemic
- Lotononis exstipulata L.Bolus, endemic
- Lotononis falcata (E.Mey.) Benth. indigenous
- Lotononis fastigiata (E.Mey.) B.-E.van Wyk, endemic
- Lotononis filiformis B.-E.van Wyk, endemic
- Lotononis foliosa Bolus, accepted as Leobordea foliosa (Bolus) B.-E.van Wyk & Boatwr. indigenous
- Lotononis fruticoides B.-E.van Wyk, endemic
- Lotononis furcata (Merxm. & A.Schreib.) A.Schreib. accepted as Leobordea furcata (Merxm. & A.Schreib.) L.A.Silva & J.Freitas, indigenous
- Lotononis galpinii Dummer, indigenous
- Lotononis glabra (Thunb.) D.Dietr. endemic
- Lotononis glabrescens (Dummer) B.-E.van Wyk, endemic
- Lotononis globulosa B.-E.van Wyk, accepted as Leobordea globulosa (B.-E.van Wyk) B.-E.van Wyk & Boatwr. present
- Lotononis gracilifolia B.-E.van Wyk, endemic
- Lotononis grandis Dummer & Jenn. accepted as Leobordea grandis (Dummer) B.-E.van Wyk & Boatwr. endemic
- Lotononis harveyi B.-E.van Wyk, endemic
- Lotononis hirsuta (Thunb.) D.Dietr., accepted as Euchlora hirsuta (Thunb.) Druce, present
- Lotononis holosericea (E.Mey.) B.-E.van Wyk, endemic
- Lotononis involucrata (P.J.Bergius) Benth. indigenous
  - Lotononis involucrata (P.J.Bergius) Benth. subsp. bracteata B.-E.van Wyk, endemic
  - Lotononis involucrata (P.J.Bergius) Benth. subsp. digitata B.-E.van Wyk, endemic
  - Lotononis involucrata (P.J.Bergius) Benth. subsp. involucrata, endemic
  - Lotononis involucrata (P.J.Bergius) Benth. subsp. peduncularis (E.Mey.) B.-E.van Wyk, endemic
- Lotononis jacottetii (Schinz) B.-E.van Wyk, indigenous
- Lotononis lamprifolia B.-E.van Wyk, endemic
- Lotononis lanceolata (E.Mey.) Benth. accepted as Leobordea lanceolata (E.Mey.) B.-E.van Wyk & Boatwr. indigenous
- Lotononis laticeps B.-E.van Wyk, accepted as Leobordea laticeps (B.-E.van Wyk) B.-E.van Wyk & Boatwr. endemic
- Lotononis laxa Eckl. & Zeyh. indigenous
- Lotononis lenticula (E.Mey.) Benth. endemic
- Lotononis leptoloba Bolus, endemic
- Lotononis linearifolia B.-E.van Wyk, indigenous
- Lotononis listii Polhill, accepted as Listia heterophylla E.Mey. indigenous
- Lotononis longicephala B.-E.van Wyk, accepted as Leobordea longicephala (B.-E.van Wyk) B.-E.van Wyk & Boatwr. endemic
- Lotononis longiflora Bolus, accepted as Leobordea longiflora (Bolus) B.-E.van Wyk & Boatwr. endemic
- Lotononis lotononoides (Scott-Elliot) B.-E.van Wyk, indigenous
- Lotononis macrocarpa Eckl. & Zeyh. accepted as Ezoloba macrocarpa (Eckl. & Zeyh.) B.-E.van Wyk & Boatwr. present
- Lotononis macrosepala Conrath, indigenous
- Lotononis maculata Dummer, indigenous
- Lotononis magnifica B.-E.van Wyk, accepted as Leobordea magnifica (B.-E.van Wyk) B.-E.van Wyk & Boatwr. endemic
- Lotononis magnistipulata Dummer, accepted as Argyrolobium lotoides Harv. present
- Lotononis marlothii Engl. accepted as Listia marlothii (Engl.) B.-E.van Wyk & Boatwr. indigenous
- Lotononis maximiliani Schltr. ex De Wild. endemic
- Lotononis meyeri (C.Presl) B.-E.van Wyk, endemic
- Lotononis micrantha Eckl. & Zeyh. endemic
- Lotononis minima B.-E.van Wyk, accepted as Listia minima (B.-E.van Wyk) B.-E.van Wyk & Boatwr. endemic
- Lotononis minor Dummer & Jenn. indigenous
- Lotononis mirabilis Dinter, accepted as Leobordea mirabilis (Dinter) B.-E.van Wyk & Boatwr.
- Lotononis mollis (E.Mey.) Benth. accepted as Leobordea mollis (E.Mey.) B.-E.van Wyk & Boatwr. endemic
- Lotononis monophylla Harv. endemic
- Lotononis mucronata Conrath, accepted as Leobordea mucronata (Conrath) B.-E.van Wyk & Boatwr. indigenous
- Lotononis nutans B.-E.van Wyk, endemic
- Lotononis oligocephala B.-E.van Wyk, accepted as Leobordea oligocephala (B.-E.van Wyk) B.-E.van Wyk & Boatwr. endemic
- Lotononis oxyptera (E.Mey.) Benth. endemic
- Lotononis pallens (Eckl. & Zeyh.) Benth. endemic
- Lotononis pariflora N.E.Br. accepted as Leobordea pariflora (N.E.Br.) B.-E.van Wyk & Boatwr. endemic
- Lotononis parviflora (P.J.Bergius) D.Dietr. endemic
- Lotononis pentaphylla (E.Mey.) Benth. accepted as Leobordea pentaphylla (E.Mey.) B.-E.van Wyk & Boatwr. endemic
- Lotononis perplexa (E.Mey.) Eckl. & Zeyh. endemic
- Lotononis platycarpa (Viv.) Pic.Serm. accepted as Leobordea platycarpa (Viv.) B.-E.van Wyk & Boatwr. indigenous
  - Lotononis platycarpa (Viv.) Pic.Serm. var. abyssinica (Hochst. ex A.Rich.) Pic.Serm. accepted as Leobordea platycarpa (Viv.) B.-E.van Wyk & Boatwr. indigenous
- Lotononis plicata B.-E.van Wyk, accepted as Leobordea plicata (B.-E.van Wyk) B.-E.van Wyk & Boatwr. endemic
- Lotononis polycephala Benth. accepted as Leobordea polycephala (E.Mey.) B.-E.van Wyk & Boatwr. endemic
- Lotononis pottiae Burtt Davy, endemic
- Lotononis procumbens Bolus, accepted as Leobordea procumbens (Bolus) B.-E.van Wyk & Boatwr. indigenous
- Lotononis prolifera (E.Mey.) B.-E.van Wyk, accepted as Leobordea prolifera (E.Mey.) Eckl. & Zeyh. endemic
- Lotononis prostrata (L.) Benth. endemic
- Lotononis pulchella (E.Mey.) B.-E.van Wyk, indigenous
- Lotononis pulchra Dummer, accepted as Leobordea pulchra (Dummer) B.-E.van Wyk & Boatwr. indigenous
- Lotononis pumila Eckl. & Zeyh. endemic
- Lotononis pungens Eckl. & Zeyh. endemic
- Lotononis purpurescens B.-E.van Wyk, endemic
- Lotononis pusilla Dummer, accepted as Leobordea pusilla (Dummer) B.-E.van Wyk & Boatwr. endemic
- Lotononis quinata (E.Mey.) Benth. accepted as Leobordea quinata (E.Mey.) B.-E.van Wyk & Boatwr. endemic
- Lotononis rabenaviana Dinter & Harms, indigenous
- Lotononis racemiflora B.-E.van Wyk, endemic
- Lotononis rigida (E.Mey.) Benth. endemic
- Lotononis rosea Dummer, accepted as Leobordea rosea (Dummer) L.A.Silva & J.Freitas, indigenous
- Lotononis rostrata Benth. indigenous
  - Lotononis rostrata Benth. subsp. brachybotrys B.-E.van Wyk, endemic
  - Lotononis rostrata Benth. subsp. namaquensis (Bolus) B.-E.van Wyk, endemic
  - Lotononis rostrata Benth. subsp. rostrata, endemic
- Lotononis sabulosa T.M.Salter, endemic
- Lotononis schoenfelderi (Dinter ex Merxm. & A.Schreib.) A.Schreib., accepted as Leobordea schoenfelderi (Dinter ex Merxm. & A.Schreib.) B.-E.van Wyk & Boatwr.
- Lotononis sericophylla Benth. indigenous
- Lotononis solitudinis Dummer, accepted as Listia solitudinis (Dummer) B.-E.van Wyk & Boatwr. endemic
- Lotononis sparsiflora (E.Mey.) B.-E.van Wyk, indigenous
- Lotononis spicata Compton, accepted as Leobordea spicata (Compton) B.-E.van Wyk & Boatwr.
- Lotononis stenophylla (Eckl. & Zeyh.) B.-E.van Wyk, endemic
- Lotononis stipulosa Baker f. accepted as Leobordea stipulosa (Baker f.) B.-E.van Wyk & Boatwr. indigenous
- Lotononis stricta (Eckl. & Zeyh.) B.-E.van Wyk, indigenous
- Lotononis strigillosa (Merxm. & A.Schreib.) A.Schreib. indigenous
- Lotononis subulata B.-E.van Wyk, accepted as Listia subulata (B.-E.van Wyk) B.-E.van Wyk & Boatwr. endemic
- Lotononis sutherlandii Dummer, accepted as Leobordea sutherlandii (Dummer) B.-E.van Wyk & Boatwr. endemic
- Lotononis tenella (E.Mey.) Eckl. & Zeyh., endemic
- Lotononis trichodes (E.Mey.) B.-E.van Wyk, endemic
- Lotononis umbellata (L.) Benth. endemic
- Lotononis varia (E.Mey.) Steud. endemic
- Lotononis venosa B.-E.van Wyk, endemic
- Lotononis viborgioides Benth. endemic
- Lotononis villosa (E.Mey.) Steud. endemic
- Lotononis viminea (E.Mey.) B.-E.van Wyk, endemic
- Lotononis virgata B.-E.van Wyk, endemic
- Lotononis wilmsii Dummer, accepted as Leobordea hirsuta (Schinz) B.-E.van Wyk & Boatwr. endemic

=== Lotus ===
Genus Lotus:

- Lotus arabicus L. indigenous
- Lotus corniculatus L. not indigenous, naturalised
  - Lotus corniculatus L. var. corniculatus, not indigenous, naturalised
- Lotus discolor E.Mey. indigenous
  - Lotus discolor E.Mey. subsp. discolor, indigenous
- Lotus mossamedensis Welw. ex Baker, accepted as Lotus arabicus L. present
- Lotus namulensis Brand, indigenous
- Lotus subbiflorus Lag. not indigenous, naturalised
  - Lotus subbiflorus Lag. subsp. subbiflorus, not indigenous, naturalised

=== Lupinus ===
Genus Lupinus:

- Lupinus angustifolius L. not indigenous, naturalised
- Lupinus consentinii Guss. not indigenous, naturalised
- Lupinus luteus L. not indigenous, naturalised
- Lupinus pilosus L., not indigenous, naturalised

=== Macroptilium ===
Genus Macroptilium:

- Macroptilium atropurpureum (DC.) Urb. not indigenous, naturalised, invasive

=== Macrotyloma ===
Genus Macrotyloma:

- Macrotyloma axillare (E.Mey.) Verdc. indigenous
  - Macrotyloma axillare (E.Mey.) Verdc. var. axillare, indigenous
  - Macrotyloma axillare (E.Mey.) Verdc. var. glabrum (E.Mey.) Verdc. indigenous
- Macrotyloma coddii Verdc. endemic
- Macrotyloma maranguense (Taub.) Verdc. indigenous
- Macrotyloma uniflorum (Lam.) Verdc. indigenous
  - Macrotyloma uniflorum (Lam.) Verdc. var. stenocarpum (Brenan) Verdc. indigenous

=== Medicago ===
Genus Medicago:

- Medicago falcata L. not indigenous, naturalised
- Medicago laciniata (L.) Mill. var. laciniata, not indigenous, naturalised
- Medicago lupulina L. not indigenous, naturalised
- Medicago polymorpha L. not indigenous, naturalised, invasive
- Medicago sativa L. not indigenous, cultivated, naturalised, invasive
  - Medicago sativa L. subsp. sativa, not indigenous, cultivated, naturalised, invasive
- Medicago x hemicycla Grossh. not indigenous, naturalised

=== Melilotus ===
Genus Melilotus:

- Melilotus albus Medik., not indigenous, naturalised, invasive
- Melilotus indicus (L.) All. not indigenous, naturalised, invasive
- Melilotus officinalis (L.) Pall. not indigenous, naturalised

=== Melolobium ===
Genus Melolobium:

- Melolobium adenodes Eckl. & Zeyh. indigenous
- Melolobium aethiopicum (L.) Druce, endemic
- Melolobium alpinum Eckl. & Zeyh. indigenous
- Melolobium burchelli N.E.Br. accepted as Melolobium microphyllum (L.f.) Eckl. & Zeyh. present
- Melolobium calycinum Benth. indigenous
- Melolobium candicans (E.Mey.) Eckl. & Zeyh. indigenous
- Melolobium canescens Benth. indigenous
- Melolobium decumbens (E.Mey.) Burtt Davy, accepted as Melolobium microphyllum (L.f.) Eckl. & Zeyh.
- Melolobium exudans Harv. endemic
- Melolobium glanduliferum Dummer, accepted as Melolobium microphyllum (L.f.) Eckl. & Zeyh. present
- Melolobium humile Eckl. & Zeyh. endemic
- Melolobium karasbergense L.Bolus, accepted as Melolobium adenodes Eckl. & Zeyh. present
- Melolobium lampolobum (E.Mey.) Moteetee & B.-E.van Wyk, endemic
- Melolobium macrocalyx Dummer, indigenous
- Melolobium macrocalyx Dummer var. longifolium Dummer, indigenous
- Melolobium macrocalyx Dummer var. macrocalyx, indigenous
- Melolobium microphyllum (L.f.) Eckl. & Zeyh. indigenous
- Melolobium obcordatum Harv. indigenous
- Melolobium parviflorum Benth. accepted as Melolobium candicans (E.Mey.) Eckl. & Zeyh. present
- Melolobium pegleri Dummer, accepted as Melolobium alpinum Eckl. & Zeyh. present
- Melolobium stipulatum (Thunb.) Harv. endemic
- Melolobium subspicatum Conrath, endemic
- Melolobium villosum Harms, accepted as Melolobium calycinum Benth. present
- Melolobium wilmsii Harms, endemic

=== Microcharis ===
Genus Microcharis:

- Microcharis disjuncta (J.B.Gillett) Schrire, indigenous
  - Microcharis disjuncta (J.B.Gillett) Schrire var. disjuncta, indigenous
- Microcharis galpinii N.E.Br. indigenous
- Microcharis latifolia Benth. indigenous

=== Millettia ===
Genus Millettia:

- Millettia grandis (E.Mey.) Skeels, endemic
- Millettia stuhlmannii Taub. indigenous
- Millettia sutherlandii Harv. accepted as Philenoptera sutherlandii (Harv.) Schrire, indigenous

=== Mimosa ===
Genus Mimosa:

- Mimosa pigra L. not indigenous, naturalised, invasive
- Mimosa pudica L. var. hispida Brenan, not indigenous, naturalised

=== Mucuna ===
Genus Mucuna:

- Mucuna coriacea Baker, indigenous
  - Mucuna coriacea Baker subsp. irritans (Burtt Davy) Verdc. indigenous
- Mucuna gigantea (Willd.) DC. indigenous
  - Mucuna gigantea (Willd.) DC. subsp. gigantea, indigenous
- Mucuna pruriens (L.) DC. indigenous
  - Mucuna pruriens (L.) DC. var. pruriens, indigenous
  - Mucuna pruriens (L.) DC. var. utilis (Wall. ex Wight) Baker ex Burck, not indigenous, naturalised

=== Mundulea ===
Genus Mundulea:

- Mundulea sericea (Willd.) A.Chev. indigenous
  - Mundulea sericea (Willd.) A.Chev. subsp. sericea, indigenous

=== Neonotonia ===
Genus Neonotonia:

- Neonotonia wightii (Wight ex Arn.) J.A.Lackey, indigenous

=== Neorautanenia ===
Genus Neorautanenia:

- Neorautanenia amboensis Schinz, accepted as Neorautanenia mitis (A.Rich.) Verdc. indigenous
- Neorautanenia brachypus (Harms) C.A.Sm. accepted as Neorautanenia mitis (A.Rich.) Verdc. present
- Neorautanenia deserticola C.A.Sm. accepted as Neorautanenia ficifolia (Benth. ex Harv.) C.A.Sm. present
- Neorautanenia ficifolia (Benth. ex Harv.) C.A.Sm. indigenous
- Neorautanenia mitis (A.Rich.) Verdc. indigenous

=== Neptunia ===
Genus Neptunia:

- Neptunia oleracea Lour. indigenous

=== Nesphostylis ===
Genus Nesphostylis:

- Nesphostylis junodii (Harms) Munyeny. & F.A.Bisby, indigenous

=== Newtonia ===
Genus Newtonia:

- Newtonia hildebrandtii (Vatke) Torre, indigenous
- Newtonia hildebrandtii (Vatke) Torre var. hildebrandtii, indigenous

=== Ononis ===
Genus Ononis:

- Ononis excisa Thunb. accepted as Crotalaria excisa (Thunb.) Baker f. subsp. excisa, indigenous
- Ononis quinata Thunb. accepted as Leobordea quinata (E.Mey.) B.-E.van Wyk & Boatwr. indigenous

=== Ophrestia ===
Genus Ophrestia:

- Ophrestia oblongifolia (E.Mey.) H.M.L.Forbes, indigenous
  - Ophrestia oblongifolia (E.Mey.) H.M.L.Forbes var. oblongifolia, indigenous
  - Ophrestia oblongifolia (E.Mey.) H.M.L.Forbes var. velutinosa H.M.L.Forbes, endemic

=== Ormocarpum ===
Genus Ormocarpum:

- Ormocarpum kirkii S.Moore, indigenous
- Ormocarpum trichocarpum (Taub.) Engl. indigenous

=== Ornithopus ===
Genus Ornithopus:

- Ornithopus compressus L. not indigenous, cultivated, naturalised, invasive
- Ornithopus pinnatus (Mill.) Druce, not indigenous, cultivated, naturalised
- Ornithopus sativus Brot. not indigenous, cultivated, naturalised, invasive

=== Otholobium ===
Genus Otholobium:

- Otholobium accrescens C.H.Stirt. endemic
- Otholobium acuminatum (Lam.) C.H.Stirt. endemic
- Otholobium afrum (Eckl. & Zeyh.) C.H.Stirt. endemic
- Otholobium arborescens C.H.Stirt. endemic
- Otholobium argenteum (Thunb.) C.H.Stirt. endemic
- Otholobium bolusii (H.M.L.Forbes) C.H.Stirt. endemic
- Otholobium bowieanum (Harv.) C.H.Stirt. endemic
- Otholobium bracteolatum (Eckl. & Zeyh.) C.H.Stirt. endemic
- Otholobium candicans (Eckl. & Zeyh.) C.H.Stirt. endemic
- Otholobium carneum (E.Mey.) C.H.Stirt. endemic
- Otholobium decumbens (Aiton) C.H.Stirt. accepted as Otholobium virgatum (Burm.f.) C.H.Stirt. present
- Otholobium flexuosum C.H.Stirt. endemic
- Otholobium foliosum (Oliv.) C.H.Stirt. indigenous
  - Otholobium foliosum (Oliv.) C.H.Stirt. subsp. gazense (Baker f.) Verdc. indigenous
- Otholobium fruticans (L.) C.H.Stirt. endemic
- Otholobium fumeum C.H.Stirt. endemic
- Otholobium hamatum (Harv.) C.H.Stirt. endemic
- Otholobium heterosepalum (Fourc.) C.H.Stirt. endemic
- Otholobium hirtum (L.) C.H.Stirt. endemic
- Otholobium incanum C.H.Stirt. endemic
- Otholobium macradenium (Harv.) C.H.Stirt. endemic
- Otholobium mundianum (Eckl. & Zeyh.) C.H.Stirt. endemic
- Otholobium nigricans C.H.Stirt. indigenous
- Otholobium obliquum (E.Mey.) C.H.Stirt. endemic
- Otholobium parviflorum (E.Mey.) C.H.Stirt. endemic
- Otholobium pictum C.H.Stirt. endemic
- Otholobium polyphyllum (Eckl. & Zeyh.) C.H.Stirt. endemic
- Otholobium polystictum (Benth. ex Harv.) C.H.Stirt. indigenous
- Otholobium prodiens C.H.Stirt. indigenous
- Otholobium pungens C.H.Stirt. endemic
- Otholobium pustulatum C.H.Stirt. endemic
- Otholobium racemosum (Thunb.) C.H.Stirt. endemic
- Otholobium rotundifolium (L.f.) C.H.Stirt. endemic
- Otholobium rubicundum C.H.Stirt. endemic
- Otholobium saxosum C.H.Stirt. endemic
- Otholobium sericeum (Poir.) C.H.Stirt. endemic
- Otholobium spicatum (L.) C.H.Stirt. endemic
- Otholobium stachyerum (Eckl. & Zeyh.) C.H.Stirt. endemic
- Otholobium striatum (Thunb.) C.H.Stirt. endemic
- Otholobium swartbergense C.H.Stirt. endemic
- Otholobium thomii (Harv.) C.H.Stirt. endemic
- Otholobium trianthum (E.Mey.) C.H.Stirt. endemic
- Otholobium uncinatum (Eckl. & Zeyh.) C.H.Stirt. endemic
- Otholobium venustum (Eckl. & Zeyh.) C.H.Stirt. endemic
- Otholobium virgatum (Burm.f.) C.H.Stirt. endemic
- Otholobium wilmsii (Harms) C.H.Stirt. indigenous
- Otholobium zeyheri (Harv.) C.H.Stirt. endemic

=== Otoptera ===
Genus Otoptera:

- Otoptera burchellii DC. indigenous

=== Paraserianthes ===
Genus Paraserianthes:

- Paraserianthes lophantha (Willd.) I.C.Nielsen, accepted as Paraserianthes lophantha (Willd.) I.C.Nielsen subsp. lophantha, not indigenous, naturalised
  - Paraserianthes lophantha (Willd.) I.C.Nielsen subsp. lophantha, not indigenous, naturalised, invasive

=== Parkinsonia ===
Genus Parkinsonia:

- Parkinsonia aculeata L. not indigenous, naturalised, invasive
- Parkinsonia africana Sond. indigenous

=== Pearsonia ===
Genus Pearsonia:

- Pearsonia aristata (Schinz) Dummer, indigenous
- Pearsonia bracteata (Benth.) Polhill, endemic
- Pearsonia cajanifolia (Harv.) Polhill, indigenous
  - Pearsonia cajanifolia (Harv.) Polhill subsp. cajanifolia, endemic
  - Pearsonia cajanifolia (Harv.) Polhill subsp. cryptantha (Baker) Polhill, indigenous
- Pearsonia callistoma Campb.-Young & K.Balkwill, endemic
- Pearsonia grandifolia (Bolus) Polhill, indigenous
  - Pearsonia grandifolia (Bolus) Polhill subsp. grandifolia, endemic
  - Pearsonia grandifolia (Bolus) Polhill subsp. latibracteolata (Dummer) Polhill, indigenous
- Pearsonia hirsuta Germish. endemic
- Pearsonia mbabanensis Compton, accepted as Pearsonia sessilifolia (Harv.) Dummer subsp. marginata (Schinz) Polhill
- Pearsonia obovata (Schinz) Polhill, endemic
- Pearsonia sessilifolia (Harv.) Dummer, indigenous
  - Pearsonia sessilifolia (Harv.) Dummer subsp. filifolia (Bolus) Polhill, indigenous
  - Pearsonia sessilifolia (Harv.) Dummer subsp. marginata (Schinz) Polhill, indigenous
  - Pearsonia sessilifolia (Harv.) Dummer subsp. sessilifolia, indigenous
  - Pearsonia sessilifolia (Harv.) Dummer subsp. swaziensis (Bolus) Polhill, indigenous
- Pearsonia uniflora (Kensit) Polhill, indigenous

=== Peltophorum ===
Genus Peltophorum:

- Peltophorum africanum Sond. indigenous

=== Philenoptera ===
Genus Philenoptera:

- Philenoptera bussei (Harms) Schrire, indigenous
- Philenoptera sutherlandii (Harv.) Schrire, endemic
- Philenoptera violacea (Klotzsch) Schrire, indigenous

=== Piliostigma ===
Genus Piliostigma:

- Piliostigma thonningii (Schumach.) Milne-Redh. indigenous

=== Pleiospora ===
Genus Pleiospora:

- Pleiospora holosericea Schinz, accepted as Pearsonia cajanifolia (Harv.) Polhill subsp. cryptantha (Baker) Polhill, present

=== Podalyria ===
Genus Podalyria:

- Podalyria amoena Eckl. & Zeyh. endemic
- Podalyria biflora Lam., endemic
- Podalyria burchellii DC., endemic
- Podalyria buxifolia (Retz.) Willd., endemic
- Podalyria calyptrata (Retz.) Willd. endemic
- Podalyria canescens E.Mey., endemic
- Podalyria chrysantha Adamson, accepted as Stirtonanthus chrysanthus (Adamson) B.-E.van Wyk & A.L.Schutte, present
- Podalyria cordata R.Br. endemic
- Podalyria cuneifolia Vent., endemic
- Podalyria glauca DC. endemic
- Podalyria hamata E.Mey. endemic
- Podalyria hirsuta (Aiton) Willd. endemic
- Podalyria insignis Compton, accepted as Stirtonanthus insignis (Compton) B.-E.van Wyk & A.L.Schutte, present
- Podalyria leipoldtii L.Bolus, endemic
- Podalyria microphylla E.Mey. endemic
- Podalyria montana Hutch. endemic
- Podalyria myrtillifolia (Retz.) Willd., endemic
- Podalyria oleaefolia Salisb. endemic
- Podalyria orbicularis E.Mey. endemic
- Podalyria pearsonii E.Phillips, endemic
- Podalyria pulcherrima Schinz, endemic
- Podalyria racemulosa Eckl. & Zeyh. endemic
- Podalyria reticulata Harv. endemic
- Podalyria rotundifolia (P.J.Bergius) A.L.Schutte, indigenous
- Podalyria sericea (Andrews) R.Br. ex Aiton f. endemic
- Podalyria speciosa Eckl. & Zeyh. endemic
- Podalyria tayloriana L.Bolus, accepted as Stirtonanthus taylorianus (L.Bolus) B.-E.van Wyk & A.L.Schutte, present
- Podalyria variabilis A.L.Schutte, endemic
- Podalyria velutina Burch. ex Benth. endemic

=== Polhillia ===
Genus Polhillia:

- Polhillia brevicalyx (C.H.Stirt.) B.-E.van Wyk & A.L.Schutte, endemic
- Polhillia canescens C.H.Stirt. endemic
- Polhillia connatum (Harv.) C.H.Stirt. endemic
- Polhillia ignota Boatwr. endemic
- Polhillia involucrata (Thunb.) B.-E.van Wyk & A.L.Schutte, endemic
- Polhillia obsoleta (Harv.) B.-E.van Wyk, endemic
- Polhillia pallens C.H.Stirt. endemic

=== Polytropia ===
Genus Polytropia:

- Polytropia ferulifolia C.Presl, accepted as Rhynchosia ferulifolia (C.Presl) Benth. ex Harv. indigenous
- Polytropia pinnata Eckl. & Zeyh. accepted as Rhynchosia pinnata (Eckl. & Zeyh.) Harv. indigenous
- Polytropia umbellata L. accepted as Rhynchosia ferulifolia (C.Presl) Benth. ex Harv. indigenous

=== Pomaria ===
Genus Pomaria:

- Pomaria burchellii (DC.) B.B.Simpson & G.P.Lewis, indigenous
  - Pomaria burchellii (DC.) B.B.Simpson & G.P.Lewis subsp. burchellii, indigenous
  - Pomaria burchellii (DC.) B.B.Simpson & G.P.Lewis subsp. rubro-violacea (Baker f.) Brummitt, indigenous
- Pomaria lactea (Schinz) B.B.Simpson & G.P.Lewis, indigenous
- Pomaria sandersonii (Harv.) B.B.Simpson & G.P.Lewis, endemic

=== Priestleya ===
Genus Priestleya:

- Priestleya angustifolia Eckl. & Zeyh. accepted as Liparia angustifolia (Eckl. & Zeyh.) A.L.Schutte, present
- Priestleya boucheri E.G.H.Oliv. & Fellingham, accepted as Liparia boucheri (E.G.H.Oliv. & Fellingham) A.L.Schutte, present
- Priestleya calycina L.Bolus, accepted as Liparia calycina (L.Bolus) A.L.Schutte, present
- Priestleya capitata (Thunb.) DC. accepted as Liparia capitata Thunb. present
- Priestleya hirsuta (Thunb.) DC. accepted as Liparia hirsuta Thunb. present
- Priestleya laevigata (L.) DC. accepted as Liparia laevigata (L.) Thunb. endemic
- Priestleya laevigata (L.) Druce, accepted as Liparia laevigata (L.) Thunb. endemic
- Priestleya latifolia Benth. accepted as Liparia latifolia (Benth.) A.L.Schutte, present
- Priestleya leiocarpa Eckl. & Zeyh. accepted as Liparia myrtifolia Thunb. present
- Priestleya myrtifolia DC. accepted as Liparia myrtifolia Thunb. present
- Priestleya thunbergii Benth. accepted as Liparia laevigata (L.) Thunb. present
- Priestleya tomentosa (L.) Druce, accepted as Liparia vestita Thunb. present
- Priestleya umbellifera (Thunb.) DC., accepted as Liparia umbellifera Thunb. present

=== Prosopis ===
Genus Prosopis:

- Prosopis chilensis (Molina) Stuntz, not indigenous, naturalised
- Prosopis glandulosa Torr. not indigenous, naturalised
  - Prosopis glandulosa Torr. var. glandulosa, not indigenous, naturalised
  - Prosopis glandulosa Torr. var. torreyana (Benson) M.C.Johnst. not indigenous, naturalised, invasive
- Prosopis pubescens Benth. not indigenous, naturalised
- Prosopis velutina Wooton, not indigenous, naturalised, invasive

=== Pseudarthria ===
Genus Pseudarthria:

- Pseudarthria hookeri Wight & Arn. indigenous
  - Pseudarthria hookeri Wight & Arn. var. hookeri, indigenous

=== Psoralea ===
Genus Psoralea:

- Psoralea abbottii C.H.Stirt. indigenous
- Psoralea aculeata L., endemic
- Psoralea affinis Eckl. & Zeyh. endemic
- Psoralea alata (Thunb.) T.M.Salter, endemic
- Psoralea angustifolia Jacq. endemic
- Psoralea aphylla L. endemic
- Psoralea arborea Sims, indigenous
- Psoralea asarina (P.J.Bergius) T.M.Salter, endemic
- Psoralea axillaris L., endemic
- Psoralea capitata L.f. accepted as Psoralea ensifolia (Houtt.) Merr. present
- Psoralea cataracta C.H.Stirt. endemic
- Psoralea diturnerae A.Bello, C.H.Stirt. & Muasya, endemic
- Psoralea ensifolia (Houtt.) Merr. indigenous
- Psoralea fascicularis DC. endemic
- Psoralea filifolia Thunb. endemic
- Psoralea fleta C.H.Stirt. endemic
- Psoralea fruticans (L.) Druce, accepted as Otholobium fruticans (L.) C.H.Stirt. present
- Psoralea gigantea Dludlu, Muasya & C.H.Stirt. endemic
- Psoralea glabra E.Mey. indigenous
- Psoralea glaucescens Eckl. & Zeyh. endemic
- Psoralea glaucina Harv. endemic
- Psoralea gueinzii Harv. endemic
- Psoralea imbricata (L.) T.M.Salter, endemic
- Psoralea implexa C.H.Stirt. endemic
- Psoralea keetii Schonland ex H.M.L.Forbes, endemic
- Psoralea kougaensis C.H.Stirt. Muasya & A.Bello, endemic
- Psoralea latifolia (Harv.) C.H.Stirt. accepted as Psoralea arborea Sims, present
- Psoralea laxa T.M.Salter, endemic
- Psoralea margaretiflora C.H.Stirt. & V.R.Clark, indigenous
- Psoralea monophylla (L.) C.H.Stirt. endemic
- Psoralea odoratissima Jacq. endemic
- Psoralea oligophylla Eckl. & Zeyh. endemic
- Psoralea oreophila Schltr. endemic
- Psoralea peratica C.H.Stirt. endemic
- Psoralea pinnata L. indigenous
  - Psoralea pinnata L. var. latifolia Harv. accepted as Psoralea arborea Sims, indigenous
  - Psoralea pinnata L. var. pinnata, endemic
- Psoralea plauta C.H.Stirt. endemic
- Psoralea prostrata L. accepted as Rhynchosia ferulifolia (C.Presl) Benth. ex Harv. indigenous
- Psoralea pullata C.H.Stirt. endemic
- Psoralea ramulosa C.H.Stirt. endemic
- Psoralea repens L. endemic
- Psoralea restioides Eckl. & Zeyh. endemic
- Psoralea speciosa Eckl. & Zeyh. endemic
- Psoralea tenuifolia L., endemic
  - Psoralea tenuifolia Thunb., accepted as Psoralea fascicularis DC. endemic
- Psoralea tenuissima E.Mey. endemic
- Psoralea triflora Thunb., endemic
- Psoralea trullata C.H.Stirt. endemic
- Psoralea usitata C.H.Stirt. endemic
- Psoralea vanberkeliae C.H.Stirt. A.Bello & Muasya, endemic
- Psoralea verrucosa Willd. endemic

=== Pterocarpus ===
Genus Pterocarpus:

- Pterocarpus angolensis DC. indigenous
- Pterocarpus lucens Lepr. ex Guill. & Perr. indigenous
  - Pterocarpus lucens Lepr. ex Guill. & Perr. subsp. antunesii (Taub.) Rojo, indigenous
- Pterocarpus rotundifolius (Sond.) Druce, indigenous
  - Pterocarpus rotundifolius (Sond.) Druce subsp. rotundifolius, indigenous

=== Pterolobium ===
Genus Pterolobium:

- Pterolobium stellatum (Forssk.) Brenan, indigenous

=== Ptycholobium ===
Genus Ptycholobium:

- Ptycholobium biflorum (E.Mey.) Brummitt, indigenous
  - Ptycholobium biflorum (E.Mey.) Brummitt subsp. biflorum, indigenous
- Ptycholobium contortum (N.E.Br.) Brummitt, indigenous
- Ptycholobium plicatum (Oliv.) Harms, indigenous
  - Ptycholobium plicatum (Oliv.) Harms subsp. plicatum, indigenous

=== Pueraria ===
Genus Pueraria:

- Pueraria montana (Lour.) Merr. not indigenous, naturalised
  - Pueraria montana (Lour.) Merr. var. lobata (Willd.) Maesen & S.M.Almeida ex Sanjappa & Predeep, not indigenous, naturalised, invasive

=== Rafnia ===
Genus Rafnia:

- Rafnia acuminata (E.Mey.) G.J.Campb. & B.-E.van Wyk, endemic
- Rafnia affinis Harv. accepted as Rafnia elliptica Thunb., present
- Rafnia alata G.J.Campb. & B.-E.van Wyk, endemic
- Rafnia amplexicaulis (L.) Thunb. endemic
- Rafnia angulata Thunb. indigenous
  - Rafnia angulata Thunb. subsp. angulata, endemic
  - Rafnia angulata Thunb. subsp. ericifolia (T.M.Salter) G.J.Campb. & B.-E.van Wyk, endemic
  - Rafnia angulata Thunb. subsp. humilis (Eckl. & Zeyh.) G.J.Campb. & B.-E.van Wyk, endemic
  - Rafnia angulata Thunb. subsp. montana G.J.Campb. & B.-E.van Wyk, endemic
  - Rafnia angulata Thunb. subsp. thunbergii (Harv.) G.J.Campb. & B.-E.van Wyk, endemic
- Rafnia axillaris Thunb., accepted as Rafnia elliptica Thunb., present
- Rafnia capensis (L.) Schinz, indigenous
  - Rafnia capensis (L.) Schinz subsp. calycina G.J.Campb. & B.-E.van Wyk, endemic
  - Rafnia capensis (L.) Schinz subsp. capensis, endemic
  - Rafnia capensis (L.) Schinz subsp. carinata G.J.Campb. & B.-E.van Wyk, endemic
  - Rafnia capensis (L.) Schinz subsp. dichotoma (Eckl. & Zeyh.) G.J.Campb. & B.-E.van Wyk, endemic
  - Rafnia capensis (L.) Schinz subsp. elsieae G.J.Campb. & B.-E.van Wyk, endemic
  - Rafnia capensis (L.) Schinz subsp. ovata (P.J.Bergius) G.J.Campb. & B.-E.van Wyk, endemic
  - Rafnia capensis (L.) Schinz subsp. pedicellata G.J.Campb. & B.-E.van Wyk, endemic
- Rafnia crassifolia Harv. endemic
- Rafnia crispa C.H.Stirt. endemic
- Rafnia cuneifolia Thunb. accepted as Rafnia capensis (L.) Schinz subsp. ovata (P.J.Bergius) G.J.Campb. & B.-E.van Wyk, present
- Rafnia dichotoma Eckl. & Zeyh. accepted as Rafnia capensis (L.) Schinz subsp. dichotoma (Eckl. & Zeyh.) G.J.Campb. & B.-E.van Wyk, present
- Rafnia diffusa Thunb., endemic
- Rafnia elliptica Thunb., endemic
- Rafnia ericifolia T.M.Salter, accepted as Rafnia angulata Thunb. subsp. ericifolia (T.M.Salter) G.J.Campb. & B.-E.van Wyk, present
- Rafnia fastigiata Eckl. & Zeyh. accepted as Rafnia triflora Thunb. present
- Rafnia globosa G.J.Campb. & B.-E.van Wyk, endemic
- Rafnia inaequalis G.J.Campb. & B.-E.van Wyk, endemic
- Rafnia lancea (Thunb.) DC. endemic
- Rafnia meyeri Schinz, accepted as Rafnia ovata E.Mey., present
- Rafnia opposita (L.) Thunb. accepted as Rafnia capensis (L.) Schinz subsp. capensis, present
- Rafnia ovata (P.J.Bergius) Schinz, accepted as Rafnia capensis (L.) Schinz subsp. ovata (P.J.Bergius) G.J.Campb. & B.-E.van Wyk, present
- Rafnia ovata E.Mey., endemic
- Rafnia racemosa Eckl. & Zeyh. indigenous
  - Rafnia racemosa Eckl. & Zeyh. subsp. pumila G.J.Campb. & B.-E.van Wyk, endemic
  - Rafnia racemosa Eckl. & Zeyh. subsp. racemosa, endemic
- Rafnia retroflexa Thunb. accepted as Rafnia capensis (L.) Schinz subsp. capensis, present
- Rafnia rostrata G.J.Campb. & B.-E.van Wyk, indigenous
  - Rafnia rostrata G.J.Campb. & B.-E.van Wyk subsp. pluriflora G.J.Campb. & B.-E.van Wyk, endemic
  - Rafnia rostrata G.J.Campb. & B.-E.van Wyk subsp. rostrata, endemic
- Rafnia schlechteriana Schinz, endemic
- Rafnia spicata Thunb., endemic
- Rafnia thunbergii Harv. accepted as Rafnia angulata Thunb. subsp. thunbergii (Harv.) G.J.Campb. & B.-E.van Wyk, present
- Rafnia triflora Thunb. endemic
- Rafnia vlokii G.J.Campb. & B.-E.van Wyk, endemic

=== Requienia ===
Genus Requienia:

- Requienia pseudosphaerosperma (Schinz) Brummitt, indigenous
- Requienia sphaerosperma DC. indigenous

=== Rhynchosia ===
Genus Rhynchosia:

- Rhynchosia adenodes Eckl. & Zeyh. indigenous
  - Rhynchosia adenodes Eckl. & Zeyh. var. cooperi Harv. ex Baker f. accepted as Rhynchosia cooperi (Harv. ex Baker f.) Burtt Davy, indigenous
- Rhynchosia albiflora (Sims) Alston, accepted as Rhynchosia hirta (Andrews) Meikle & Verdc. present
- Rhynchosia albissima Gand. indigenous
- Rhynchosia angulosa Schinz, indigenous
- Rhynchosia angustifolia (Jacq.) DC. endemic
- Rhynchosia argentea (Thunb.) Harv. endemic
- Rhynchosia arida C.H.Stirt. endemic
- Rhynchosia atropurpurea Germish. indigenous
- Rhynchosia bolusii Boatwr. & Moteetee, endemic
- Rhynchosia bullata Benth. ex Harv. endemic
- Rhynchosia calvescens Meikle, endemic
- Rhynchosia capensis (Burm.f.) Schinz, endemic
- Rhynchosia caribaea (Jacq.) DC. indigenous
- Rhynchosia chrysantha Schltr. ex Zahlbr. endemic
- Rhynchosia chrysoscias Benth. ex Harv. endemic
- Rhynchosia ciliata (Thunb.) Schinz, endemic
- Rhynchosia cinnamomea Schinz, accepted as Rhynchosia totta (Thunb.) DC. var. venulosa (Hiern) Verdc. indigenous
- Rhynchosia clivorum S.Moore, indigenous
  - Rhynchosia clivorum S.Moore subsp. clivorum, indigenous
  - Rhynchosia clivorum S.Moore subsp. pycnantha (Harms) Verdc. indigenous
  - Rhynchosia clivorum S.Moore var. clivorum, accepted as Rhynchosia clivorum S.Moore subsp. clivorum, indigenous
- Rhynchosia confusa Burtt Davy, indigenous
- Rhynchosia connata Baker f. endemic
- Rhynchosia cooperi (Harv. ex Baker f.) Burtt Davy, indigenous
- Rhynchosia crassifolia Benth. ex Harv. indigenous
- Rhynchosia densiflora (Roth) DC. indigenous
- Rhynchosia densiflora (Roth) DC. subsp. chrysadenia (Taub.) Verdc. indigenous
- Rhynchosia elegantissima Schinz, accepted as Rhynchosia totta (Thunb.) DC. var. venulosa (Hiern) Verdc. indigenous
- Rhynchosia emarginata Germish. endemic
- Rhynchosia ferulifolia (C.Presl) Benth. ex Harv. endemic
- Rhynchosia foliosa Markotter, endemic
- Rhynchosia galpinii Baker f. endemic
- Rhynchosia grandifolia Steud. endemic
- Rhynchosia harmsiana Schltr. ex Zahlbr. indigenous
  - Rhynchosia harmsiana Schltr. ex Zahlbr. var. burchellii Burtt Davy, indigenous
  - Rhynchosia harmsiana Schltr. ex Zahlbr. var. harmsiana, indigenous
- Rhynchosia harveyi Eckl. & Zeyh. endemic
- Rhynchosia hirsuta Eckl. & Zeyh., indigenous
- Rhynchosia hirta (Andrews) Meikle & Verdc. indigenous
- Rhynchosia holosericea Schinz, indigenous
- Rhynchosia humilis Eckl. & Zeyh. accepted as Rhynchosia totta (Thunb.) DC. var. totta, indigenous
- Rhynchosia jacottetii Schinz, accepted as Rhynchosia reptabunda N.E.Br. present
- Rhynchosia komatiensis Harms, indigenous
- Rhynchosia leucoscias Benth. ex Harv. endemic
- Rhynchosia longiflora Schinz, accepted as Rhynchosia totta (Thunb.) DC. var. rigidula (DC.) Moteetee & M.M.le Roux
- Rhynchosia microscias Benth. ex Harv. endemic
- Rhynchosia minima (L.) DC. indigenous
  - Rhynchosia minima (L.) DC. var. falcata (E.Mey.) Verdc. indigenous
  - Rhynchosia minima (L.) DC. var. minima, indigenous
  - Rhynchosia minima (L.) DC. var. prostrata (Harv.) Meikle, indigenous
- Rhynchosia mollis Burtt Davy, accepted as Rhynchosia totta (Thunb.) DC. var. venulosa (Hiern) Verdc. indigenous
- Rhynchosia monophylla Schltr. indigenous
- Rhynchosia namaensis Schinz, accepted as Rhynchosia totta (Thunb.) DC. var. rigidula (DC.) Moteetee & M.M.le Roux
- Rhynchosia nervosa Benth. ex Harv. indigenous
  - Rhynchosia nervosa Benth. ex Harv. var. nervosa, indigenous
  - Rhynchosia nervosa Benth. ex Harv. var. petiolata Burtt Davy, accepted as Rhynchosia totta (Thunb.) DC. var. totta, endemic
- Rhynchosia nitens Benth. ex Harv. indigenous
- Rhynchosia ovata J.M.Wood & M.S.Evans, endemic
- Rhynchosia paniculata (E.Mey.) Steud. accepted as Rhynchosia totta (Thunb.) DC. var. totta, indigenous
- Rhynchosia parviflora (E.Mey.) Druce, accepted as Rhynchosia microscias Benth. ex Harv. present
- Rhynchosia pauciflora Bolus, indigenous
- Rhynchosia pedunculata M.M.le Roux & Moteetee, endemic
- Rhynchosia peglerae Baker f. endemic
- Rhynchosia pentheri Schltr. ex Zahlbr. indigenous
  - Rhynchosia pentheri Schltr. ex Zahlbr. var. hutchinsoniana Burtt Davy, indigenous
  - Rhynchosia pentheri Schltr. ex Zahlbr. var. pentheri, indigenous
- Rhynchosia pilosa (E.Mey.) Harv., accepted as Rhynchosia totta (Thunb.) DC. var. totta, indigenous
  - Rhynchosia pilosa (E.Mey.) Steud., accepted as Rhynchosia totta (Thunb.) DC. var. totta, indigenous
- Rhynchosia pinnata (Eckl. & Zeyh.) Harv. endemic
- Rhynchosia remota Conrath, accepted as Rhynchosia totta (Thunb.) DC. var. venulosa (Hiern) Verdc. indigenous
- Rhynchosia reptabunda N.E.Br. indigenous
- Rhynchosia resinosa (Hochst. ex A.Rich.) Baker, indigenous
- Rhynchosia rigidula DC. accepted as Rhynchosia totta (Thunb.) DC. var. rigidula (DC.) Moteetee & M.M.le Roux, indigenous
- Rhynchosia rogersii Schinz, indigenous
- Rhynchosia schlechteri Baker f. endemic
- Rhynchosia smithiana Moteetee & Boatwr. endemic
- Rhynchosia sordida (E.Mey.) Schinz, indigenous
- Rhynchosia spectabilis Schinz, endemic
- Rhynchosia stenodon Baker f. endemic
- Rhynchosia sublobata (Schumach.) Meikle, indigenous
- Rhynchosia thorncroftii (Baker f.) Burtt Davy, indigenous
- Rhynchosia totta (Thunb.) DC. indigenous
  - Rhynchosia totta (Thunb.) DC. var. fenchelii Schinz, accepted as Rhynchosia totta (Thunb.) DC. var. venulosa (Hiern) Verdc.
  - Rhynchosia totta (Thunb.) DC. var. graciliflora Harms ex Baker f. accepted as Rhynchosia totta (Thunb.) DC. var. totta, indigenous
  - Rhynchosia totta (Thunb.) DC. var. longicalyx Moteetee & M.M.le Roux, indigenous
  - Rhynchosia totta (Thunb.) DC. var. namaensis (Schinz) Baker f. accepted as Rhynchosia totta (Thunb.) DC. var. rigidula (DC.) Moteetee & M.M.le Roux
  - Rhynchosia totta (Thunb.) DC. var. pilosa (E.Mey.) Baker f. accepted as Rhynchosia totta (Thunb.) DC. var. totta, indigenous
  - Rhynchosia totta (Thunb.) DC. var. rigidula (DC.) Moteetee & M.M.le Roux, indigenous
  - Rhynchosia totta (Thunb.) DC. var. totta, indigenous
  - Rhynchosia totta (Thunb.) DC. var. unifoliolata (Burtt Davy) Baker f. accepted as Rhynchosia totta (Thunb.) DC. var. totta, indigenous
  - Rhynchosia totta (Thunb.) DC. var. venulosa (Hiern) Verdc. indigenous
- Rhynchosia unifoliolata Burtt Davy, accepted as Rhynchosia totta (Thunb.) DC. var. totta, indigenous
- Rhynchosia vendae C.H.Stirt. endemic
- Rhynchosia venulosa (Hiern) K.Schum. accepted as Rhynchosia totta (Thunb.) DC. var. venulosa (Hiern) Verdc. indigenous
- Rhynchosia villosa (Meisn.) Druce, endemic
- Rhynchosia viscidula Steud. endemic
- Rhynchosia woodii Schinz, indigenous

=== Robinia ===
Genus Robinia:

- Robinia pseudoacacia L. not indigenous, naturalised, invasive

=== Rothia ===
Genus Rothia:

- Rothia hirsuta (Guill. & Perr.) Baker, indigenous

=== Schotia ===
Genus Schotia:

- Schotia afra (L.) Thunb. indigenous
  - Schotia afra (L.) Thunb. var. afra, endemic
  - Schotia afra (L.) Thunb. var. angustifolia (E.Mey.) Harv. indigenous
- Schotia brachypetala Sond. indigenous
- Schotia capitata Bolle, indigenous
- Schotia latifolia Jacq. indigenous

=== Senegalia ===
Genus Senegalia:

- Senegalia afra (Thunb.) P.J.H.Hurter & Mabb. indigenous
- Senegalia ataxacantha (DC.) Kyal. & Boatwr. indigenous
- Senegalia brevispica (Harms) Seigler & Ebinger subsp. dregeana (Benth.) Kyal. & Boatwr. indigenous
- Senegalia burkei (Benth.) Kyal. & Boatwr. indigenous
- Senegalia cinerea (Schinz) Kyal. & Boatwr. indigenous
- Senegalia circummarginata (Chiov.) Kyal. & Boatwr. indigenous
- Senegalia erubescens (Welw. ex Oliv.) Kyal. & Boatwr. indigenous
- Senegalia galpinii (Burtt Davy) Seigler & Ebinger, indigenous
- Senegalia hereroensis (Engl.) Kyal. & Boatwr. indigenous
- Senegalia kraussiana (Meisn. ex Benth.) Kyal. & Boatwr. indigenous
- Senegalia mellifera (Vahl) Seigler & Ebinger, indigenous
  - Senegalia mellifera (Vahl) Seigler & Ebinger subsp. detinens (Burch.) Kyal. & Boatwr. indigenous
  - Senegalia mellifera (Vahl) Seigler & Ebinger subsp. mellifera, indigenous
- Senegalia montis-salinarum N.Hahn, endemic
- Senegalia nigrescens (Oliv.) P.J.H.Hurter, indigenous
- Senegalia polyacantha (Willd.) Seigler & Ebinger, indigenous
  - Senegalia polyacantha (Willd.) Seigler & Ebinger subsp. campylacantha (Hochst. ex A.Rich.) Kyal. & B, indigenous
- Senegalia schweinfurthii (Brenan & Exell) Seigler & Ebinger, indigenous
  - Senegalia schweinfurthii (Brenan & Exell) Seigler & Ebinger var. schweinfurthii, indigenous
- Senegalia senegal (L.) Britton, indigenous
  - Senegalia senegal (L.) Britton var. leiorhachis (Brenan) Kyal. & Boatwr. indigenous
  - Senegalia senegal (L.) Britton var. rostrata (Brenan) Kyal. & Boatwr. indigenous
- Senegalia welwitschii (Oliv.) Kyal. & Boatwr. indigenous
  - Senegalia welwitschii (Oliv.) Kyal. & Boatwr. subsp. delagoensis (Harms ex Burtt Davy) Kyal. & Boatw, indigenous

=== Senna ===
Genus Senna:

- Senna bicapsularis (L.) Roxb. not indigenous, naturalised, invasive
- Senna corymbosa (Lam.) H.S.Irwin & Barneby, not indigenous, naturalised
- Senna didymobotrya (Fresen.) H.S.Irwin & Barneby, not indigenous, cultivated, naturalised, invasive
- Senna hirsuta (L.) H.S.Irwin & Barneby, not indigenous, naturalised, invasive
- Senna italica Mill. indigenous
- Senna italica Mill. subsp. arachoides (Burch.) Lock, indigenous
- Senna multiglandulosa (Jacq.) H.S.Irwin & Barneby, not indigenous, naturalised
- Senna obtusifolia (L.) H.S.Irwin & Barneby, not indigenous, naturalised
- Senna occidentalis (L.) Link, not indigenous, naturalised, invasive
- Senna pendula (Willd.) H.S.Irwin & Barneby, not indigenous, naturalised
- Senna pendula (Willd.) H.S.Irwin & Barneby var. glabrata (Vogel) H.S.Irwin & Barneby, not indigenous, naturalised, invasive
- Senna petersiana (Bolle) Lock, indigenous
- Senna septemtrionalis (Viv.) H.S.Irwin & Barneby, not indigenous, naturalised, invasive
- Senna siamea (Lam.) H.S.Irwin & Barneby, not indigenous, naturalised
- Senna spectabilis (DC.) H.S.Irwin & Barneby, not indigenous, cultivated, naturalised, invasive

=== Sesbania ===
Genus Sesbania:

- Sesbania bispinosa (Jacq.) W.Wight var. bispinosa, not indigenous, naturalised
- Sesbania brevipedunculata J.B.Gillett, indigenous
- Sesbania macowaniana Schinz, indigenous
- Sesbania macrantha Welw. ex E.Phillips & Hutch. indigenous
  - Sesbania macrantha Welw. ex E.Phillips & Hutch. var. levis J.B.Gillett, indigenous
  - Sesbania macrantha Welw. ex E.Phillips & Hutch. var. macrantha, indigenous
- Sesbania marginata Benth. accepted as Sesbania virgata (Cav.) Pers. present
- Sesbania notialis J.B.Gillett, endemic
- Sesbania punicea (Cav.) Benth. not indigenous, naturalised, invasive
- Sesbania rogersii E.Phillips & Hutch. indigenous
- Sesbania sesban (L.) Merr. indigenous
  - Sesbania sesban (L.) Merr. subsp. sesban, indigenous
  - Sesbania sesban (L.) Merr. subsp. sesban var. nubica, indigenous
  - Sesbania sesban (L.) Merr. subsp. sesban var. sesban, indigenous
  - Sesbania sesban (L.) Merr. subsp. sesban var. zambesiaca, indigenous
- Sesbania tetraptera Hochst. ex Baker, indigenous
  - Sesbania tetraptera Hochst. ex Baker subsp. tetraptera, indigenous
- Sesbania transvaalensis J.B.Gillett, indigenous
- Sesbania tripetii (Poit.) Hort. ex F.T.Hubb. accepted as Sesbania punicea (Cav.) Benth. not indigenous, naturalised
- Sesbania virgata (Cav.) Pers. not indigenous, naturalised

=== Smithia ===
Genus Smithia:

- Smithia erubescens (E.Mey.) Baker f. indigenous

=== Sophora ===
Genus Sophora:

- Sophora inhambanensis Klotzsch, indigenous
- Sophora japonica L. accepted as Styphnolobium japonicum (L.) Schott, not indigenous, naturalised

=== Spartium ===
Genus Spartium:

- Spartium junceum L. not indigenous, cultivated, naturalised, invasive

=== Sphenostylis ===
Genus Sphenostylis:

- Sphenostylis angustifolia Sond. indigenous
- Sphenostylis marginata E.Mey. indigenous
  - Sphenostylis marginata E.Mey. subsp. marginata, indigenous

=== Stirtonanthus ===
Genus Stirtonanthus:

- Stirtonanthus chrysanthus (Adamson) B.-E.van Wyk & A.L.Schutte, endemic
- Stirtonanthus insignis (Compton) B.-E.van Wyk & A.L.Schutte, endemic
- Stirtonanthus taylorianus (L.Bolus) B.-E.van Wyk & A.L.Schutte, endemic

=== Stirtonia ===
Genus Stirtonia:

- Stirtonia chrysantha (Adamson) B.-E.van Wyk & A.L.Schutte, accepted as Stirtonanthus chrysanthus (Adamson) B.-E.van Wyk & A.L.Schutte, present
- Stirtonia insignis (Compton) B.-E.van Wyk & A.L.Schutte, accepted as Stirtonanthus insignis (Compton) B.-E.van Wyk & A.L.Schutte, present
- Stirtonia tayloriana (L.Bolus) B.-E.van Wyk & A.L.Schutte, accepted as Stirtonanthus taylorianus (L.Bolus) B.-E.van Wyk & A.L.Schutte, present

=== Stylosanthes ===
Genus Stylosanthes:

- Stylosanthes fruticosa (Retz.) Alston, indigenous

=== Styphnolobium ===
Genus Styphnolobium:

- Styphnolobium japonicum (L.) Schott, not indigenous, cultivated, naturalised, invasive

=== Sutherlandia ===
Genus Sutherlandia:

- Sutherlandia frutescens (L.) R.Br. accepted as Lessertia frutescens (L.) Goldblatt & J.C.Manning subsp. frutescens, indigenous
- Sutherlandia humilis E.Phillips & R.A.Dyer, accepted as Lessertia frutescens (L.) Goldblatt & J.C.Manning subsp. frutescens, endemic
- Sutherlandia microphylla Burch. ex DC. accepted as Lessertia frutescens (L.) Goldblatt & J.C.Manning subsp. microphylla (Burch. ex DC.) J.C.Manning & B, indigenous
- Sutherlandia montana E.Phillips & R.A.Dyer, accepted as Lessertia frutescens (L.) Goldblatt & J.C.Manning subsp. frutescens, indigenous
- Sutherlandia speciosa E.Phillips & R.A.Dyer, accepted as Lessertia frutescens (L.) Goldblatt & J.C.Manning subsp. speciosa (E.Phillips & R.A.Dyer) J.C.Mannin, endemic
- Sutherlandia tomentosa Eckl. & Zeyh. accepted as Lessertia canescens Goldblatt & J.C.Manning, present

=== Swartzia ===
Genus Swartzia:

- Swartzia madagascariensis Desv. accepted as Bobgunnia madagascariensis (Desv.) J.H.Kirkbr. & Wiersema

=== Tamarindus ===
Genus Tamarindus:

- Tamarindus indica L. not indigenous, naturalised

=== Tephrosia ===
Genus Tephrosia:

- Tephrosia acaciifolia Baker, indigenous
- Tephrosia aequalata Baker, indigenous
  - Tephrosia aequalata Baker subsp. australis Brummitt, indigenous
- Tephrosia albissima H.M.L.Forbes, indigenous
  - Tephrosia albissima H.M.L.Forbes subsp. albissima, indigenous
  - Tephrosia albissima H.M.L.Forbes subsp. zuluensis (H.M.L.Forbes) Schrire, endemic
- Tephrosia bachmannii Harms, endemic
- Tephrosia brummittii Schrire, indigenous
- Tephrosia burchellii Burtt Davy, indigenous
- Tephrosia capensis (Jacq.) Pers. indigenous
  - Tephrosia capensis (Jacq.) Pers. var. acutifolia E.Mey. endemic
  - Tephrosia capensis (Jacq.) Pers. var. angustifolia E.Mey. endemic
  - Tephrosia capensis (Jacq.) Pers. var. capensis, indigenous
  - Tephrosia capensis (Jacq.) Pers. var. hirsuta Harv. indigenous
  - Tephrosia capensis (Jacq.) Pers. var. longipetiolata H.M.L.Forbes, endemic
- Tephrosia cordata Hutch. & Burtt Davy, indigenous
- Tephrosia dregeana E.Mey. indigenous
  - Tephrosia dregeana E.Mey. var. dregeana, indigenous
- Tephrosia elongata E.Mey. indigenous
  - Tephrosia elongata E.Mey. var. elongata, indigenous
  - Tephrosia elongata E.Mey. var. lasiocaulos Brummitt, indigenous
  - Tephrosia elongata E.Mey. var. tzaneenensis (H.M.L.Forbes) Brummitt, indigenous
- Tephrosia euchroa I.Verd. endemic
- Tephrosia forbesii Baker, indigenous
  - Tephrosia forbesii Baker subsp. interior Brummitt, indigenous
- Tephrosia galpinii H.M.L.Forbes, accepted as Tephrosia albissima H.M.L.Forbes subsp. albissima, endemic
- Tephrosia glomeruliflora Meisn. indigenous
  - Tephrosia glomeruliflora Meisn. subsp. glomeruliflora, endemic
  - Tephrosia glomeruliflora Meisn. subsp. meisneri (Hutch. & Burtt Davy) Schrire, indigenous
- Tephrosia gracilenta H.M.L.Forbes, endemic
- Tephrosia grandiflora (Aiton) Pers. endemic
- Tephrosia inandensis H.M.L.Forbes, endemic
- Tephrosia kraussiana Meisn. indigenous
- Tephrosia limpopoensis J.B.Gillett, indigenous
- Tephrosia linearis (Willd.) Pers. indigenous
- Tephrosia longipes Meisn. indigenous
  - Tephrosia longipes Meisn. subsp. longipes var. icosisperma, accepted as Tephrosia longipes Meisn. subsp. longipes var. longipes, present
  - Tephrosia longipes Meisn. subsp. longipes var. uncinata, accepted as Tephrosia longipes Meisn. present
- Tephrosia lupinifolia DC. indigenous
- Tephrosia macropoda (E.Mey.) Harv. indigenous
  - Tephrosia macropoda (E.Mey.) Harv. var. diffusa (E.Mey.) Schrire, indigenous
  - Tephrosia macropoda (E.Mey.) Harv. var. macropoda, indigenous
- Tephrosia marginella H.M.L.Forbes, endemic
- Tephrosia multijuga R.G.N.Young, indigenous
- Tephrosia natalensis H.M.L.Forbes, indigenous
  - Tephrosia natalensis H.M.L.Forbes subsp. natalensis, indigenous
  - Tephrosia natalensis H.M.L.Forbes subsp. pseudocapitata (H.M.L.Forbes) Schrire, endemic
- Tephrosia noctiflora Bojer ex Baker, indigenous
- Tephrosia pietersii H.M.L.Forbes, endemic
- Tephrosia polystachya E.Mey. indigenous
  - Tephrosia polystachya E.Mey. var. hirta Harv. indigenous
  - Tephrosia polystachya E.Mey. var. latifolia Harv. indigenous
  - Tephrosia polystachya E.Mey. var. longidens H.M.L.Forbes, endemic
  - Tephrosia polystachya E.Mey. var. polystachya, indigenous
- Tephrosia pondoensis (Codd) Schrire, endemic
- Tephrosia pumila (Lam.) Pers. indigenous
  - Tephrosia pumila (Lam.) Pers. var. pumila, indigenous
- Tephrosia purpurea (L.) Pers. indigenous
  - Tephrosia purpurea (L.) Pers. subsp. canescens (E.Mey.) Brummitt, indigenous
  - Tephrosia purpurea (L.) Pers. subsp. leptostachya (DC.) Brummitt, indigenous
  - Tephrosia purpurea (L.) Pers. subsp. leptostachya (DC.) Brummitt var. delagoensis, indigenous
  - Tephrosia purpurea (L.) Pers. subsp. leptostachya (DC.) Brummitt var. leptostachya, indigenous
  - Tephrosia purpurea (L.) Pers. subsp. leptostachya (DC.) Brummitt var. pubescens, indigenous
  - Tephrosia purpurea (L.) Pers. subsp. purpurea, not indigenous, naturalised
- Tephrosia radicans Baker, indigenous
- Tephrosia reptans Baker, indigenous
  - Tephrosia reptans Baker var. reptans, indigenous
- Tephrosia retusa Burtt Davy, indigenous
- Tephrosia rhodesica Baker f. indigenous
  - Tephrosia rhodesica Baker f. var. evansii (Hutch. & Burtt Davy) Brummitt, indigenous
  - Tephrosia rhodesica Baker f. var. rhodesica, indigenous
- Tephrosia semiglabra Sond. indigenous
- Tephrosia shiluwanensis Schinz, indigenous
- Tephrosia subulata Hutch. & Burtt Davy, endemic
- Tephrosia uniflora Pers. indigenous
  - Tephrosia uniflora Pers. subsp. uniflora, indigenous
- Tephrosia villosa (L.) Pers. indigenous
  - Tephrosia villosa (L.) Pers. subsp. ehrenbergiana (Schweinf.) Brummitt, indigenous
  - Tephrosia villosa (L.) Pers. subsp. ehrenbergiana (Schweinf.) Brummitt var. daviesii, indigenous
  - Tephrosia villosa (L.) Pers. subsp. ehrenbergiana (Schweinf.) Brummitt var. ehrenbergiana, indigenous
- Tephrosia virgata H.M.L.Forbes, endemic
- Tephrosia vogelii Hook.f. indigenous
- Tephrosia zoutpansbergensis Bremek. indigenous

=== Teramnus ===
Genus Teramnus:

- Teramnus labialis (L.f.) Spreng. subsp. labialis, indigenous
- Teramnus labialis (L.f.) Spreng. subsp. labialis var. acutus, indigenous

=== Tipuana ===
Genus Tipuana:

- Tipuana tipu (Benth.) Kuntze, not indigenous, naturalised, invasive

=== Trifolium ===
Genus Trifolium:

- Trifolium africanum Ser. indigenous
  - Trifolium africanum Ser. var. africanum, indigenous
  - Trifolium africanum Ser. var. lydenburgense J.B.Gillett, indigenous
- Trifolium angustifolium L. var. angustifolium, not indigenous, naturalised
- Trifolium arvense L. var. arvense, not indigenous, naturalised
- Trifolium burchellianum Ser. indigenous
  - Trifolium burchellianum Ser. subsp. burchellianum, indigenous
  - Trifolium burchellianum Ser. subsp. johnstonii (Oliv.) Cufod. ex J.B.Gillett, indigenous
- Trifolium campestre Schreb. var. campestre, not indigenous, naturalised
- Trifolium cernuum Brot. not indigenous, naturalised
- Trifolium clusii Godr. & Gren. not indigenous, naturalised, invasive
- Trifolium diffusum Thunb., accepted as Leobordea rosea (Dummer) L.A.Silva & J.Freitas, indigenous
- Trifolium dubium Sibth. not indigenous, naturalised
- Trifolium glomeratum L. not indigenous, naturalised
- Trifolium hirtum All. not indigenous, naturalised, invasive
- Trifolium hybridum L. var. hybridum, not indigenous, naturalised
- Trifolium incarnatum L. var. incarnatum, not indigenous, naturalised
- Trifolium lanatum Thunb. accepted as Leobordea lanata (Thunb.) B.-E.van Wyk & Boatwr. indigenous
- Trifolium medium L. var. medium, not indigenous, naturalised
- Trifolium pratense L. var. pratense, not indigenous, naturalised
- Trifolium repens L., not indigenous, naturalised
- Trifolium resupinatum L. var. resupinatum, not indigenous, naturalised
- Trifolium stipulaceum Thunb. endemic
- Trifolium subterraneum L. var. subterraneum, not indigenous, naturalised
- Trifolium suffocatum L. not indigenous, naturalised
- Trifolium tomentosum L. var. tomentosum, not indigenous, naturalised

=== Trigonella ===
Genus Trigonella:

- Trigonella anguina Delile, indigenous
- Trigonella foenum-graecum L. not indigenous, naturalised
- Trigonella hamosa L. not indigenous, naturalised

=== Tylosema ===
Genus Tylosema:

- Tylosema esculentum (Burch.) A.Schreib. indigenous
- Tylosema fassoglense (Schweinf.) Torre & Hillc. indigenous

=== Ulex ===
Genus Ulex:

- Ulex europaeus L. not indigenous, naturalised, invasive

=== Umtiza ===
Genus Umtiza:

- Umtiza listeriana Sim, endemic

=== Vachellia ===
Genus Vachellia:

- Vachellia borleae (Burtt Davy) Kyal. & Boatwr. indigenous
- Vachellia davyi (N.E.Br.) Kyal. & Boatwr. indigenous
- Vachellia dyeri (P.P.Sw.) Kyal. & Boatwr. endemic
- Vachellia ebutsiniorum (P.J.H.Hurter) Kyal. & Boatwr. endemic
- Vachellia erioloba (E.Mey.) P.J.H.Hurter, indigenous
- Vachellia exuvialis (I.Verd.) Kyal. & Boatwr. indigenous
- Vachellia farnesiana (L.) Wight & Arn. not indigenous, naturalised
- Vachellia gerrardi (Benth.) P.J.H.Hurter, indigenous
  - Vachellia gerrardi (Benth.) P.J.H.Hurter subsp. gerrardi var. gerrardi, indigenous
- Vachellia grandicornuta (Gerstner) Seigler & Ebinger, indigenous
- Vachellia haematoxylon (Willd.) Seigler & Ebinger, indigenous
- Vachellia hebeclada (DC.) Kyal. & Boatwr. indigenous
  - Vachellia hebeclada (DC.) Kyal. & Boatwr. subsp. hebeclada, indigenous
- Vachellia karroo (Hayne) Banfi & Gallaso, indigenous
- Vachellia kosiensis (P.P.Sw. & Coates Palgr.) Kyal. & Boatwr. endemic
- Vachellia luederitzii (Engl.) Kyal. & Boatwr. indigenous
  - Vachellia luederitzii (Engl.) Kyal. & Boatwr. var. luederitzii, indigenous
  - Vachellia luederitzii (Engl.) Kyal. & Boatwr. var. retinens (Sim) & Kyal. & Boatwr. indigenous
- Vachellia montana (P.P.Sw.) Kyal. & Boatwr. indigenous
- Vachellia natalitia (E.Mey.) Kyal. & Boatwr. endemic
- Vachellia nebrownii (Burtt Davy) Seigler & Ebinger, indigenous
- Vachellia nilotica (L.) P.J.H.Hurter & Mabb. indigenous
  - Vachellia nilotica (L.) P.J.H.Hurter & Mabb. subsp. kraussiana (Benth.) Kyal. & Boatwr. indigenous
- Vachellia permixta (Burtt Davy) Kyal. & Boatwr. indigenous
- Vachellia rehmanniana (Schinz) Kyal. & Boatwr. indigenous
- Vachellia robbertsei (P.P.Sw.) Kyal. & Boatwr. endemic
- Vachellia robusta (Burch.) Kyal. & Boatwr. indigenous
  - Vachellia robusta (Burch.) Kyal. & Boatwr. subsp. clavigera (E.Mey.) & Kyal. & Boatwr. indigenous
  - Vachellia robusta (Burch.) Kyal. & Boatwr. subsp. robusta, indigenous
- Vachellia sekhukhuniensis (P.J.H.Hurter) Kyal. & Boatwr. endemic
- Vachellia sieberiana (DC.) Kyal. & Boatwr. indigenous
  - Vachellia sieberiana (DC.) Kyal. & Boatwr. var. woodii (Burtt Davy) Kyal. & Boatwr. indigenous
- Vachellia stuhlmannii (Taub.) Kyal. & Boatwr. indigenous
- Vachellia swazica (Burtt Davy) Kyal. & Boatwr. indigenous
- Vachellia tenuispina (I.Verd.) Kyal. & Boatwr. indigenous
- Vachellia tortilis (Forssk.) Gallaso & Banfi, indigenous
  - Vachellia tortilis (Forssk.) Gallaso & Banfi subsp. heteracantha (Burch.) Kyal. & Boatwr. indigenous
- Vachellia xanthophloea (Benth.) P.J.H.Hurter, indigenous

=== Vicia ===
Genus Vicia:

- Vicia angustifolia L. accepted as Vicia sativa L. subsp. nigra (L.) Ehrh. present
- Vicia benghalensis L. not indigenous, naturalised
- Vicia cracca L. not indigenous, naturalised
- Vicia eriocarpa (Hausskn.) Halacsy, not indigenous, naturalised, invasive
- Vicia hirsuta (L.) Gray, not indigenous, naturalised
- Vicia sativa L. not indigenous, naturalised
  - Vicia sativa L. subsp. nigra (L.) Ehrh. not indigenous, naturalised
  - Vicia sativa L. subsp. sativa, not indigenous, naturalised
- Vicia tetrasperma Moench, not indigenous, naturalised
- Vicia villosa Roth, not indigenous, naturalised
  - Vicia villosa Roth subsp. villosa, not indigenous, naturalised

=== Vigna ===
Genus Vigna:

- Vigna comosa Baker subsp. comosa, not indigenous, naturalised
- Vigna friesiorum Harms, indigenous
- Vigna friesiorum Harms var. friesiorum, indigenous
- Vigna frutescens A.Rich. subsp. frutescens var. frutescens, indigenous
- Vigna junodii Harms, accepted as Nesphostylis junodii (Harms) Munyeny. & F.A.Bisby, indigenous
- Vigna kokii B.J.Pienaar, indigenous
- Vigna lobatifolia Baker, accepted as Vigna vexillata (L.) A.Rich. var. lobatifolia (Baker) Pasquet
- Vigna luteola (Jacq.) Benth. indigenous
  - Vigna luteola (Jacq.) Benth. var. luteola, indigenous
- Vigna marina (Burm.) Merr. indigenous
- Vigna mudenia B.J.Pienaar, endemic
- Vigna nervosa Markotter, accepted as Vigna schlechteri Harms, indigenous
- Vigna oblongifolia A.Rich. indigenous
  - Vigna oblongifolia A.Rich. var. oblongifolia, indigenous
  - Vigna oblongifolia A.Rich. var. parviflora (Baker) Verdc. indigenous
- Vigna scabrida Burtt Davy, accepted as Vigna unguiculata (L.) Walp. subsp. unguiculata var. spontanea, present
- Vigna schlechteri Harms, indigenous
- Vigna unguiculata (L.) Walp. indigenous
  - Vigna unguiculata (L.) Walp. subsp. dekindtiana (Harms) Verdc. indigenous
  - Vigna unguiculata (L.) Walp. subsp. dekindtiana (Harms) Verdc. var. dekindtiana, indigenous
  - Vigna unguiculata (L.) Walp. subsp. dekindtiana (Harms) Verdc. var. huillensis, indigenous
  - Vigna unguiculata (L.) Walp. subsp. protracta (E.Mey.) B.J.Pienaar, indigenous
  - Vigna unguiculata (L.) Walp. subsp. stenophylla (Harv.) Marechal, Mascherpa & Stainier, indigenous
  - Vigna unguiculata (L.) Walp. subsp. tenuis (E.Mey.) Marechal, Mascherpa & Stainier, indigenous
  - Vigna unguiculata (L.) Walp. subsp. tenuis (E.Mey.) Marechal, Mascherpa & Stainier var. ovata, endemic
  - Vigna unguiculata (L.) Walp. subsp. tenuis (E.Mey.) Marechal, Mascherpa & Stainier var. tenuis, indigenous
  - Vigna unguiculata (L.) Walp. subsp. unguiculata, indigenous
  - Vigna unguiculata (L.) Walp. subsp. unguiculata var. unguiculata, indigenous
- Vigna vexillata (L.) A.Rich. indigenous
  - Vigna vexillata (L.) A.Rich. var. angustifolia (Schumach. & Thonn.) Baker, indigenous
  - Vigna vexillata (L.) A.Rich. var. davyi (Bolus) B.J.Pienaar, indigenous
  - Vigna vexillata (L.) A.Rich. var. ovata (E.Mey.) B.J.Pienaar, indigenous
  - Vigna vexillata (L.) A.Rich. var. vexillata, indigenous

=== Virgilia ===
Genus Virgilia:

- Virgilia divaricata Adamson, endemic
- Virgilia oroboides (P.J.Bergius) T.M.Salter, indigenous
  - Virgilia oroboides (P.J.Bergius) T.M.Salter subsp. ferruginea B.-E.van Wyk, endemic
  - Virgilia oroboides (P.J.Bergius) T.M.Salter subsp. oroboides, endemic

=== Wiborgia ===
Genus Wiborgia:

- Wiborgia fusca Thunb. indigenous
  - Wiborgia fusca Thunb. subsp. fusca, endemic
  - Wiborgia fusca Thunb. subsp. macrocarpa R.Dahlgren, endemic
- Wiborgia humilis (Thunb.) R.Dahlgren, accepted as Wiborgiella humilis (Thunb.) Boatwr. & B.-E.van Wyk, endemic
- Wiborgia incurvata E.Mey. endemic
- Wiborgia leptoptera R.Dahlgren, indigenous
  - Wiborgia leptoptera R.Dahlgren subsp. cedarbergensis R.Dahlgren, endemic
  - Wiborgia leptoptera R.Dahlgren subsp. leptoptera, endemic
- Wiborgia monoptera E.Mey. endemic
- Wiborgia mucronata (L.f.) Druce, endemic
- Wiborgia obcordata (P.J.Bergius) Thunb. endemic
- Wiborgia sericea Thunb. endemic
- Wiborgia tenuifolia E.Mey. endemic
- Wiborgia tetraptera E.Mey. endemic

=== Wiborgiella ===
Genus Wiborgiella:

- Wiborgiella bowieana (Benth.) Boatwr. & B.-E.van Wyk, endemic
- Wiborgiella dahlgrenii Boatwr. & B.-E.van Wyk, endemic
- Wiborgiella fasciculata (Benth.) Boatwr. & B.-E.van Wyk, endemic
- Wiborgiella humilis (Thunb.) Boatwr. & B.-E.van Wyk, endemic
- Wiborgiella inflata (Bolus) Boatwr. & B.-E.van Wyk, endemic
- Wiborgiella leipoldtiana (Schltr. ex R.Dahlgren) Boatwr. & B.-E.van Wyk, endemic
- Wiborgiella mucronata (Benth.) Boatwr. & B.-E.van Wyk, endemic
- Wiborgiella sessilifolia (Eckl. & Zeyh.) Boatwr. & B.-E.van Wyk, endemic
- Wiborgiella vlokii Boatwr. & B.-E.van Wyk, indigenous

=== Xanthocercis ===
Genus Xanthocercis:

- Xanthocercis zambesiaca (Baker) Dumaz-le-Grand, indigenous

=== Xerocladia ===
Genus Xerocladia:

- Xerocladia viridiramis (Burch.) Taub. indigenous

=== Xeroderris ===
Genus Xeroderris:

- Xeroderris stuhlmannii (Taub.) MendonÃ§a & E.C.Sousa, indigenous

=== Xiphotheca ===
Genus Xiphotheca:

- Xiphotheca canescens (Thunb.) A.L.Schutte & B.-E.van Wyk, endemic
- Xiphotheca cordifolia A.L.Schutte & B.-E.van Wyk, endemic
- Xiphotheca elliptica (DC.) A.L.Schutte & B.-E.van Wyk, endemic
- Xiphotheca fruticosa (L.) A.L.Schutte & B.-E.van Wyk, endemic
- Xiphotheca guthriei (L.Bolus) A.L.Schutte & B.-E.van Wyk, endemic
- Xiphotheca lanceolata (E.Mey.) Eckl. & Zeyh. endemic
- Xiphotheca phylicoides A.L.Schutte & B.-E.van Wyk, endemic
- Xiphotheca reflexa (Thunb.) A.L.Schutte & B.-E.van Wyk, endemic
- Xiphotheca rosmarinifolia A.L.Schutte, indigenous
- Xiphotheca tecta (Thunb.) A.L.Schutte & B.-E.van Wyk, endemic

=== Xylia ===
Genus Xylia:

- Xylia torreana Brenan, indigenous

=== Zornia ===
Genus Zornia:

- Zornia capensis Pers. indigenous
  - Zornia capensis Pers. subsp. capensis, indigenous
- Zornia glochidiata Rchb. ex DC. indigenous
- Zornia linearis E.Mey. indigenous
- Zornia milneana Mohlenbr. indigenous

== Polygalaceae ==
Family: Polygalaceae,

=== Heterosamara ===
Genus Heterosamara:

- Heterosamara galpinii (Hook.f.) Paiva, indigenous

=== Muraltia ===
Genus Muraltia:

- Muraltia acerosa Harv. endemic
- Muraltia acicularis Harv. endemic
- Muraltia acipetala Harv. endemic
- Muraltia aciphylla Levyns, endemic
- Muraltia alba Levyns, endemic
- Muraltia alopecuroides (L.) DC. endemic
- Muraltia alticola Schltr. indigenous
- Muraltia angulosa Turcz. endemic
- Muraltia angustiflora Levyns, endemic
- Muraltia arachnoidea Chodat, endemic
- Muraltia aspalatha DC. endemic
- Muraltia aspalathoides Schltr. endemic
- Muraltia asparagifolia Eckl. & Zeyh. endemic
- Muraltia barkerae Levyns, endemic
- Muraltia bolusii Levyns, endemic
- Muraltia bondii Vlok, endemic
- Muraltia brachyceras Schltr. endemic
- Muraltia brachypetala Wolley-Dod, endemic
- Muraltia brevicornu DC. endemic
- Muraltia caledonensis Levyns, endemic
- Muraltia calycina Harv. endemic
- Muraltia capensis Levyns, endemic
- Muraltia carnosa E.Mey. ex Harv. endemic
- Muraltia chamaepitys Chodat, endemic
- Muraltia ciliaris DC. endemic
- Muraltia cliffortiifolia Eckl. & Zeyh. endemic
- Muraltia collina Levyns, endemic
- Muraltia commutata Levyns, endemic
- Muraltia comptonii Levyns, endemic
- Muraltia concava Levyns, endemic
- Muraltia crassifolia Harv. endemic
- Muraltia curvipetala Levyns, endemic
- Muraltia cuspifolia Chodat, endemic
- Muraltia cyclolopha Chodat, endemic
- Muraltia decipiens Schltr. endemic
- Muraltia demissa Wolley-Dod, endemic
- Muraltia depressa DC. endemic
- Muraltia diabolica Levyns, endemic
- Muraltia dispersa Levyns, endemic
- Muraltia divaricata Eckl. & Zeyh. endemic
- Muraltia dumosa (Poir.) DC. endemic
- Muraltia elsieae Paiva, endemic
- Muraltia empetroides Chodat, indigenous
- Muraltia empleuridioides Schltr. indigenous
  - Muraltia empleuridioides Schltr. var. diversifolia Levyns, endemic
  - Muraltia empleuridioides Schltr. var. empleuridioides, endemic
- Muraltia ericaefolia DC. endemic
- Muraltia ericoides (Burm.f.) Steud. endemic
- Muraltia ferox Levyns, endemic
- Muraltia filiformis (Thunb.) DC. indigenous
  - Muraltia filiformis (Thunb.) DC. var. caledonensis Levyns, endemic
  - Muraltia filiformis (Thunb.) DC. var. filiformis, endemic
- Muraltia flanaganii Bolus, indigenous
- Muraltia gillettiae Levyns, endemic
- Muraltia guthriei Levyns, endemic
- Muraltia harveyana Levyns, endemic
- Muraltia heisteria (L.) DC. endemic
- Muraltia hirsuta Levyns, endemic
- Muraltia horrida Diels, endemic
- Muraltia hyssopifolia Chodat, endemic
- Muraltia juniperifolia (Poir.) DC. endemic
- Muraltia karroica Levyns, endemic
- Muraltia knysnaensis Levyns, endemic
- Muraltia lancifolia Harv. endemic
- Muraltia langebergensis Levyns, endemic
- Muraltia leptorhiza Turcz. endemic
- Muraltia lewisiae Levyns, endemic
- Muraltia lignosa Levyns, endemic
- Muraltia longicuspis Turcz. endemic
- Muraltia macowanii Levyns, endemic
- Muraltia macrocarpa Eckl. & Zeyh. indigenous
- Muraltia macroceras DC. endemic
- Muraltia macropetala Harv. endemic
- Muraltia minuta Levyns, endemic
- Muraltia mitior (P.J.Bergius) Levyns, endemic
- Muraltia mixta (L.f.) DC. endemic
- Muraltia montana Levyns, endemic
- Muraltia muirii F.Bolus, endemic
- Muraltia muraltioides (Eckl. & Zeyh.) Levyns, endemic
- Muraltia mutabilis Levyns, endemic
- Muraltia namaquensis Levyns, endemic
- Muraltia obovata DC. endemic
- Muraltia occidentalis Levyns, endemic
- Muraltia ononidifolia Eckl. & Zeyh. endemic
- Muraltia orbicularis Hutch. endemic
- Muraltia origanoides C.Presl, endemic
- Muraltia oxysepala Schltr. endemic
- Muraltia pageae Levyns, endemic
- Muraltia paludosa Levyns, endemic
- Muraltia pappeana Harv. endemic
- Muraltia parvifolia N.E.Br. endemic
- Muraltia pauciflora (Thunb.) DC. endemic
- Muraltia pillansii Levyns, endemic
- Muraltia plumosa Chodat, endemic
- Muraltia polyphylla (DC.) Levyns, endemic
- Muraltia pottebergensis Levyns, endemic
- Muraltia pubescens DC. endemic
- Muraltia pungens Schltr. endemic
- Muraltia rara Levyns, endemic
- Muraltia rhamnoides Chodat, endemic
- Muraltia rigida E.Mey. ex Turcz. endemic
- Muraltia rosmarinifolia Levyns, endemic
- Muraltia rubeacea Eckl. & Zeyh. endemic
- Muraltia salsolacea Chodat, endemic
- Muraltia satureioides DC. indigenous
  - Muraltia satureioides DC. var. floribunda Levyns, endemic
  - Muraltia satureioides DC. var. salteri (Levyns) & Levyns, endemic
  - Muraltia satureioides DC. var. satureioides, endemic
- Muraltia saxicola Chodat, indigenous
- Muraltia schlechteri Levyns, endemic
- Muraltia scoparia (Eckl. & Zeyh.) Levyns, indigenous
- Muraltia serpylloides DC. endemic
- Muraltia serrata Levyns, endemic
- Muraltia spicata Bolus, endemic
- Muraltia spinosa (L.) F.Forest & J.C.Manning, endemic
- Muraltia splendens Levyns, endemic
  - Muraltia splendens Levyns var. pallida Levyns, endemic
  - Muraltia splendens Levyns var. splendens, indigenous
  - Muraltia squarrosa (L.f.) DC. endemic
- Muraltia stenophylla Levyns, endemic
- Muraltia stipulacea (Burm.f.) DC. endemic
- Muraltia stokoei Levyns, endemic
- Muraltia tenuifolia (Poir.) DC. endemic
- Muraltia thunbergii Eckl. & Zeyh. endemic
- Muraltia thymifolia (Thunb.) DC. endemic
- Muraltia trinervia (L.f.) DC. endemic
- Muraltia vulnerans Levyns, endemic
- Muraltia vulpina Chodat, endemic

=== Nylandtia ===
Genus Nylandtia:

- Nylandtia scoparia (Eckl. & Zeyh.) Goldblatt & J.C.Manning, accepted as Muraltia scoparia (Eckl. & Zeyh.) Levyns, endemic
- Nylandtia spinosa (L.) Dumort. accepted as Muraltia spinosa (L.) F.Forest & J.C.Manning, endemic
  - Nylandtia spinosa (L.) Dumort. var. scoparia (Eckl. & Zeyh.) C.T.Johnson & Weitz, accepted as Muraltia scoparia (Eckl. & Zeyh.) Levyns, present

=== Polygala ===
Genus Polygala:

- Polygala affinis DC. accepted as Polygala scabra L. present
- Polygala africana Chodat, indigenous
- Polygala albida Schinz, indigenous
  - Polygala albida Schinz subsp. albida, indigenous
- Polygala amatymbica Eckl. & Zeyh. indigenous
- Polygala asbestina Burch. endemic
- Polygala bicornis (Burch.) Chodat, accepted as Polygala schinziana Chodat, present
- Polygala bowkerae Harv. endemic
- Polygala brachyphylla Chodat, endemic
- Polygala bracteolata L. endemic
- Polygala capillaris E.Mey. ex Harv. indigenous
  - Polygala capillaris E.Mey. ex Harv. subsp. capillaris, indigenous
- Polygala chloroptera Chodat, accepted as Polygala serpentaria Eckl. & Zeyh. present
- Polygala confusa MacOwan, accepted as Polygala macowaniana Paiva, present
- Polygala dasyphylla Levyns, endemic
- Polygala declinata (Harv.) E.Mey. ex Paiva, endemic
- Polygala ephedroides Burch. indigenous
- Polygala ericaefolia DC. endemic
- Polygala erioptera DC. indigenous
  - Polygala erioptera DC. subsp. erioptera, indigenous
  - Polygala erioptera DC. subsp. petraea (Chodat) Paiva, indigenous
- Polygala erubescens E.Mey. ex Chodat, indigenous
- Polygala esterae Chodat, accepted as Polygala gazensis Baker f. present
- Polygala fallax Hayek, indigenous
- Polygala fruticosa P.J.Bergius, endemic
- Polygala galpinii Hook.f. accepted as Heterosamara galpinii (Hook.f.) Paiva, present
- Polygala garcinii DC. endemic
- Polygala gazensis Baker f. indigenous
- Polygala gerrardii Chodat, endemic
- Polygala gracilenta Burtt Davy, indigenous
- Polygala gracilipes Harv. endemic
- Polygala gymnoclada MacOwan, indigenous
- Polygala hispida Burch. ex DC. indigenous
- Polygala hottentotta C.Presl, indigenous
- Polygala houtboshiana Chodat, indigenous
- Polygala illepida E.Mey. ex Harv. endemic
- Polygala krumanina Burch. ex Ficalho & Hiern, endemic
- Polygala langebergensis Levyns, endemic
- Polygala lasiosepala Levyns, indigenous
- Polygala leendertziae Burtt Davy, indigenous
- Polygala lehmanniana Eckl. & Zeyh. endemic
- Polygala leptophylla Burch. indigenous
  - Polygala leptophylla Burch. var. armata (Chodat) Paiva, indigenous
  - Polygala leptophylla Burch. var. leptophylla, indigenous
- Polygala levynsiana Paiva, endemic
- Polygala ludwigiana Eckl. & Zeyh. endemic
- Polygala lysimachiifolia Chodat, indigenous
- Polygala macowaniana Paiva, endemic
- Polygala marensis Burtt Davy, indigenous
- Polygala meridionalis Levyns, endemic
- Polygala microlopha DC. indigenous
  - Polygala microlopha DC. var. gracilis Levyns, accepted as Polygala levynsiana Paiva, present
  - Polygala microlopha DC. var. microlopha, endemic
- Polygala mossii Exell, indigenous
- Polygala myrtifolia L. indigenous
  - Polygala myrtifolia L. var. myrtifolia, indigenous
  - Polygala myrtifolia L. var. pinifolia (Lam. ex Poir.) Paiva, endemic
- Polygala natalensis Chodat, accepted as Polygala serpentaria Eckl. & Zeyh. present
- Polygala nematocaulis Levyns, endemic
- Polygala ohlendorfiana Eckl. & Zeyh. indigenous
- Polygala pappeana Eckl. & Zeyh. endemic
- Polygala parkeri Levyns, endemic
- Polygala peduncularis Burch. ex DC. endemic
- Polygala petitiana A.Rich. var. parviflora Exell, accepted as Polygala petitiana A.Rich. subsp. parviflora (Exell) Paiva
- Polygala petraea Chodat, accepted as Polygala erioptera DC. subsp. petraea (Chodat) Paiva, present
- Polygala polyphylla DC. accepted as Muraltia polyphylla (DC.) Levyns, present
- Polygala pottebergensis Levyns, endemic
- Polygala praticola Chodat, endemic
- Polygala producta N.E.Br. indigenous
- Polygala pubiflora Burch. endemic
- Polygala pungens Burch. endemic
- Polygala recognita Chodat, endemic
- Polygala reflexa Schinz, accepted as Polygala kalaxariensis Schinz, present
- Polygala refracta DC. indigenous
- Polygala rehmannii Chodat, indigenous
- Polygala retiefianum Paiva & Figueiredo, indigenous
- Polygala rhinostigma Chodat, indigenous
- Polygala rigens Burch. endemic
- Polygala rodrigueana Paiva, endemic
- Polygala scabra L. indigenous
- Polygala schinziana Chodat, indigenous
- Polygala sekhukhuniensis Retief, Siebert & A.E.van Wyk, indigenous
- Polygala seminuda Harv. indigenous
- Polygala senensis Klotzsch, indigenous
  - Polygala senensis Klotzsch var. senensis, indigenous
- Polygala serpentaria Eckl. & Zeyh. indigenous
- Polygala sphenoptera Fresen. var. sphenoptera, indigenous
- Polygala spicata Chodat, indigenous
- Polygala teretifolia L.f. indigenous
- Polygala transvaalensis Chodat, indigenous
  - Polygala transvaalensis Chodat subsp. transvaalensis, indigenous
- Polygala triquetra C.Presl, endemic
- Polygala umbellata L. endemic
- Polygala uncinata E.Mey. ex Meisn. indigenous
- Polygala virgata Thunb. indigenous
  - Polygala virgata Thunb. var. decora (Sond.) Harv. indigenous
  - Polygala virgata Thunb. var. speciosa (Sims) Harv. endemic
  - Polygala virgata Thunb. var. virgata, indigenous
- Polygala volkensii Gurke, accepted as Polygala petitiana A.Rich. subsp. petitiana, present
- Polygala welwitschii Chodat, indigenous
  - Polygala welwitschii Chodat subsp. pygmaea (Gurke) Paiva, indigenous
- Polygala wilmsii Chodat, indigenous
- Polygala wittebergensis Compton, endemic
- Polygala woodii Chodat, endemic

=== Securidaca ===
Genus Securidaca:

- Securidaca longepedunculata Fresen. indigenous
  - Securidaca longepedunculata Fresen. var. longepedunculata, indigenous
  - Securidaca longepedunculata Fresen. var. parvifolia Oliv. indigenous

== See also ==
- Helena M. L. Forbes
