= Aspalathus millefolia =

Scientific classification
- Kingdom: Plantae
- Clade: Tracheophytes
- Clade: Angiosperms
- Clade: Eudicots
- Clade: Rosids
- Order: Fabales
- Family: Fabaceae
- Subfamily: Faboideae
- Genus: Aspalathus
- Species: A. millefolia

Binomial name
- Aspalathus millefolia R.Dahlgren

Species of legume

Aspalathus millefolia is a species of Aspalathus shrub, which occurs in the Overberg region of the Western Cape Province, South Africa.

== Description ==
A low branching shrub, with many tiny (1-3 x 0,2mm), thin, linear, obtuse-tipped, slightly incurved leaves. The leaves are green and sometimes sparsely hairy.

The bracts are not stalked and the keels are short and wide. It somewhat resembles its relative Aspalathus ciliaris.

== Distribution and habitat ==
This species is indigenous to the Overberg region, in the southern Western Cape Province, South Africa.

Its habitat is typically rocky clay-rich soils of shale and alluvial terraces, where it grows in a mixture of Fynbos and Renosterveld vegetation.

It occurs from near Caledon in the west, to the area north of Bredasdorp and towards Malgas, as well as around Swellendam and Heidelberg. It occurs as far east as the town of Riversdale.
