= Borbonia =

Borbonia is a taxon synonym for two genera of flowering plants

- Borbonia L., a synonym of Aspalathus L.
- Borbonia Adans., a synonym of Ocotea Aubl.
