= Aspalathus aspalathoides =

Scientific classification
- Kingdom: Plantae
- Clade: Tracheophytes
- Clade: Angiosperms
- Clade: Eudicots
- Clade: Rosids
- Order: Fabales
- Family: Fabaceae
- Subfamily: Faboideae
- Genus: Aspalathus
- Species: A. aspalathoides

Binomial name
- Aspalathus aspalathoides (L.) R.Dahlgren

Synonyms
- Achyronia anthylloides (L.) Kuntze; Achyronia stellaris (Eckl. & Zeyh.) Kuntze; Anthyllis aspalathoides L.; Anthyllis lotoides L.; Aspalathus anthylloides L.; Aspalathus kraussiana Meisn.; Aspalathus stellaris Eckl. & Zeyh.; Paraspalathus stellaris (Eckl. & Zeyh.) C.Presl

Species of plant

Aspalathus aspalathoides is a shrub belonging to the family Fabaceae. The species is endemic to the Western Cape and is part of the fynbos. It occurs from the Cape Peninsula to Robertson, Ladismith and the Gourits River. The population is stable.
