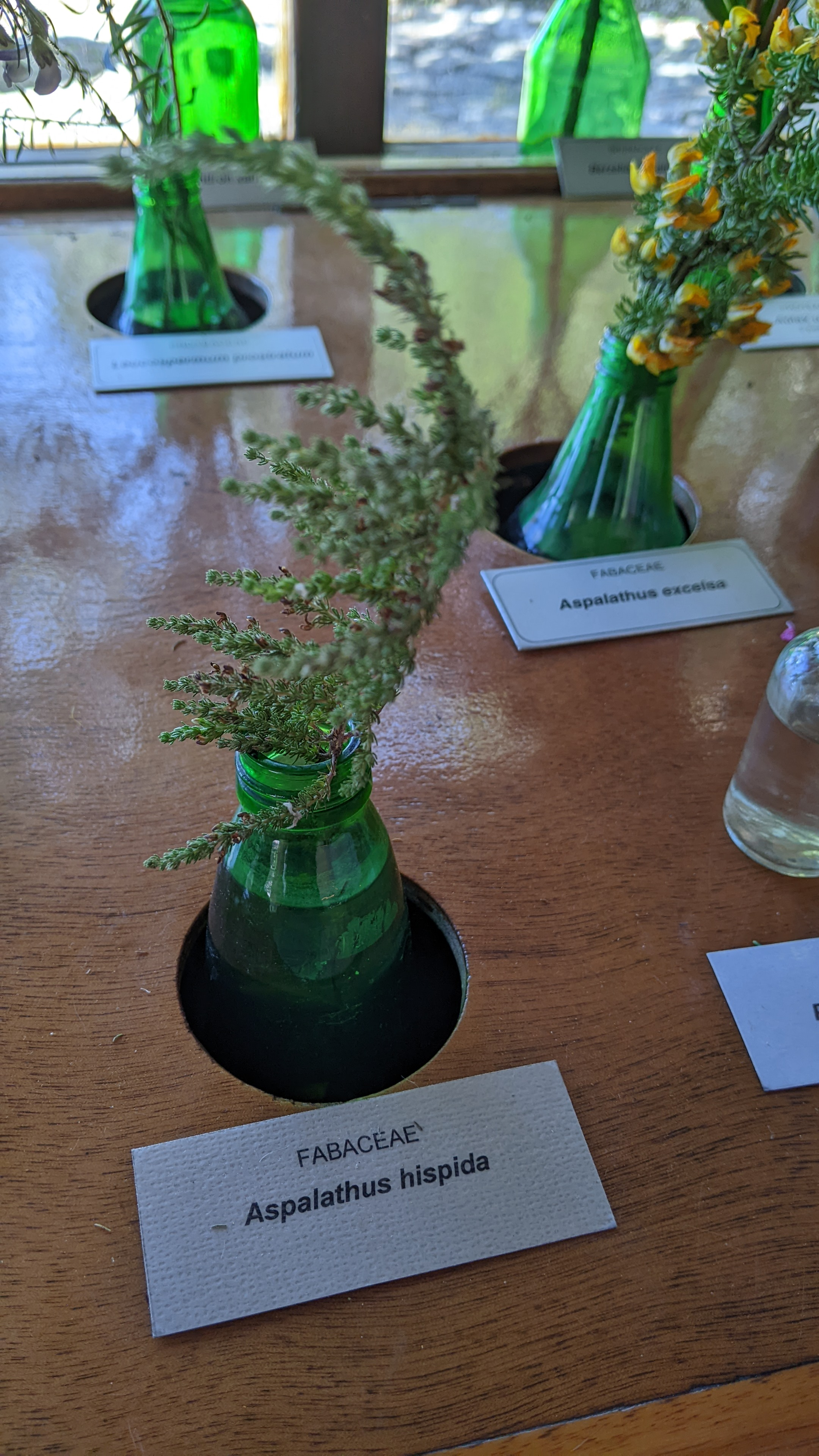

Scientific classification
- Kingdom: Plantae
- Clade: Tracheophytes
- Clade: Angiosperms
- Clade: Eudicots
- Clade: Rosids
- Order: Fabales
- Family: Fabaceae
- Subfamily: Faboideae
- Genus: Aspalathus
- Species: A. hispida

Binomial name
- Aspalathus hispida Thunb.

Synonyms
- Paraspalathus hispida (Thunb.) C.Presl

= Aspalathus hispida =

Species of plant

Aspalathus hispida, the bristle Capegorse, is a small to medium-sized shrub belonging to the family Fabaceae. The species is endemic to the Eastern Cape, Northern Cape and Western Cape and is part of the fynbos.

The species has two subspecies:

- Aspalathus hispida subsp. albiflora (Eckl. & Zeyh.) R.Dahlgren
- Aspalathus hispida subsp. hispida
