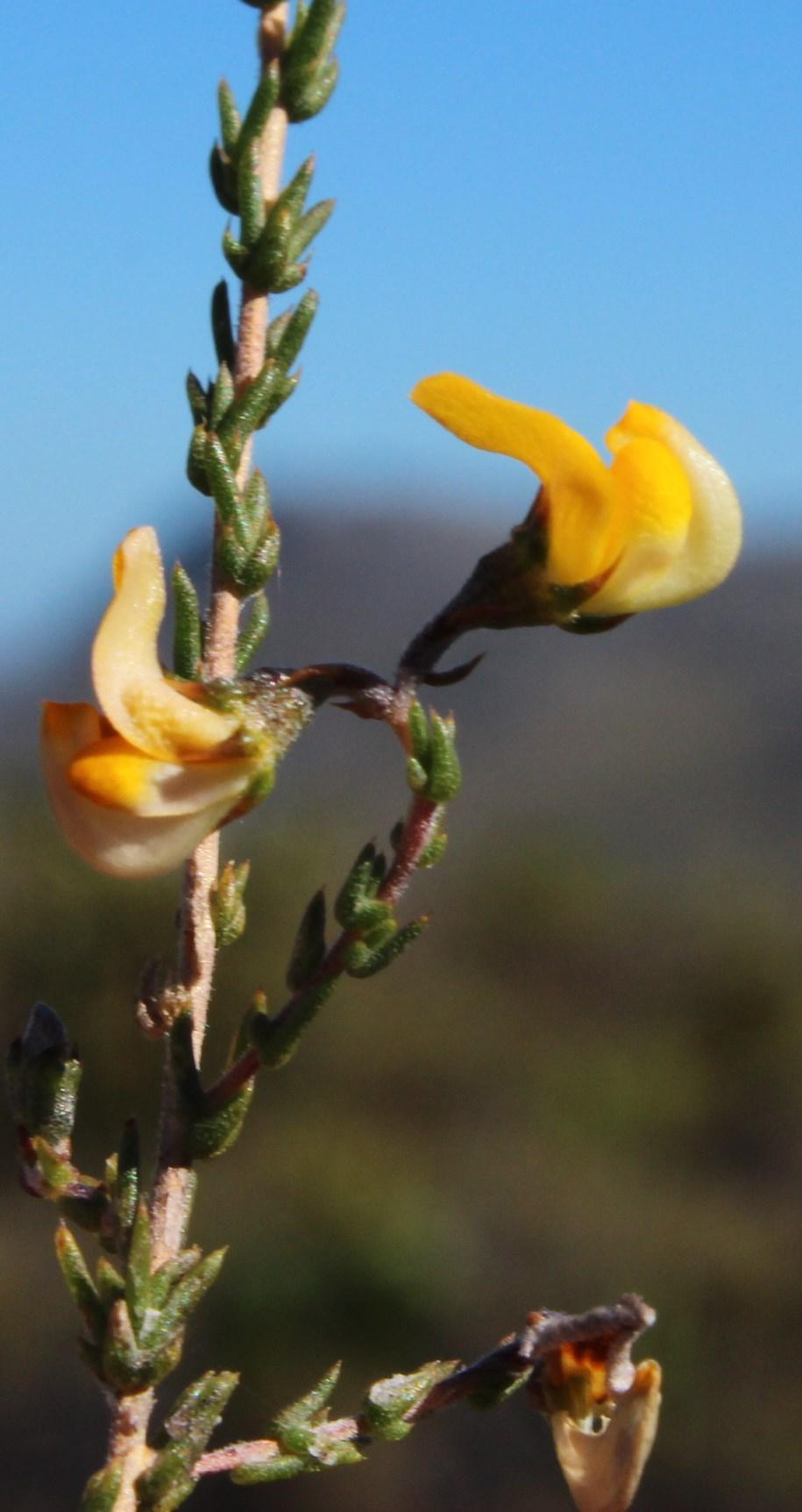

Scientific classification
- Kingdom: Plantae
- Clade: Embryophytes
- Clade: Tracheophytes
- Clade: Spermatophytes
- Clade: Angiosperms
- Clade: Eudicots
- Clade: Rosids
- Order: Fabales
- Family: Fabaceae
- Subfamily: Faboideae
- Genus: Aspalathus
- Species: A. microphylla

Binomial name
- Aspalathus microphylla DC.

Synonyms
- Aspalathus divergens Willd. ex E.Mey.

= Aspalathus microphylla =

Species of plant

Aspalathus microphylla is a small to medium-sized shrub belonging to the family Fabaceae. The species is endemic to the Western Cape and forms part of the fynbos. It occurs from Bokbaai to Swellendam and the Agulhas Plain.
