= Aspalathus hystrix =

Scientific classification
- Kingdom: Plantae
- Clade: Tracheophytes
- Clade: Angiosperms
- Clade: Eudicots
- Clade: Rosids
- Order: Fabales
- Family: Fabaceae
- Subfamily: Faboideae
- Genus: Aspalathus
- Species: A. hystrix

Binomial name
- Aspalathus hystrix L.f.

Synonyms
- Achyronia hystrix (L.f.) Kuntze; Aspalathus echinata St.-Lag.; Streptosema histrix C.Presl

Species of plant

Aspalathus hystrix, commonly known as the porcupine Capegorse, is a small to medium shrub belonging to the family Fabaceae. The species is endemic to the Western Cape and occurs from Ladismith to Laingsburg and Willowmore where it is part of the fynbos.
