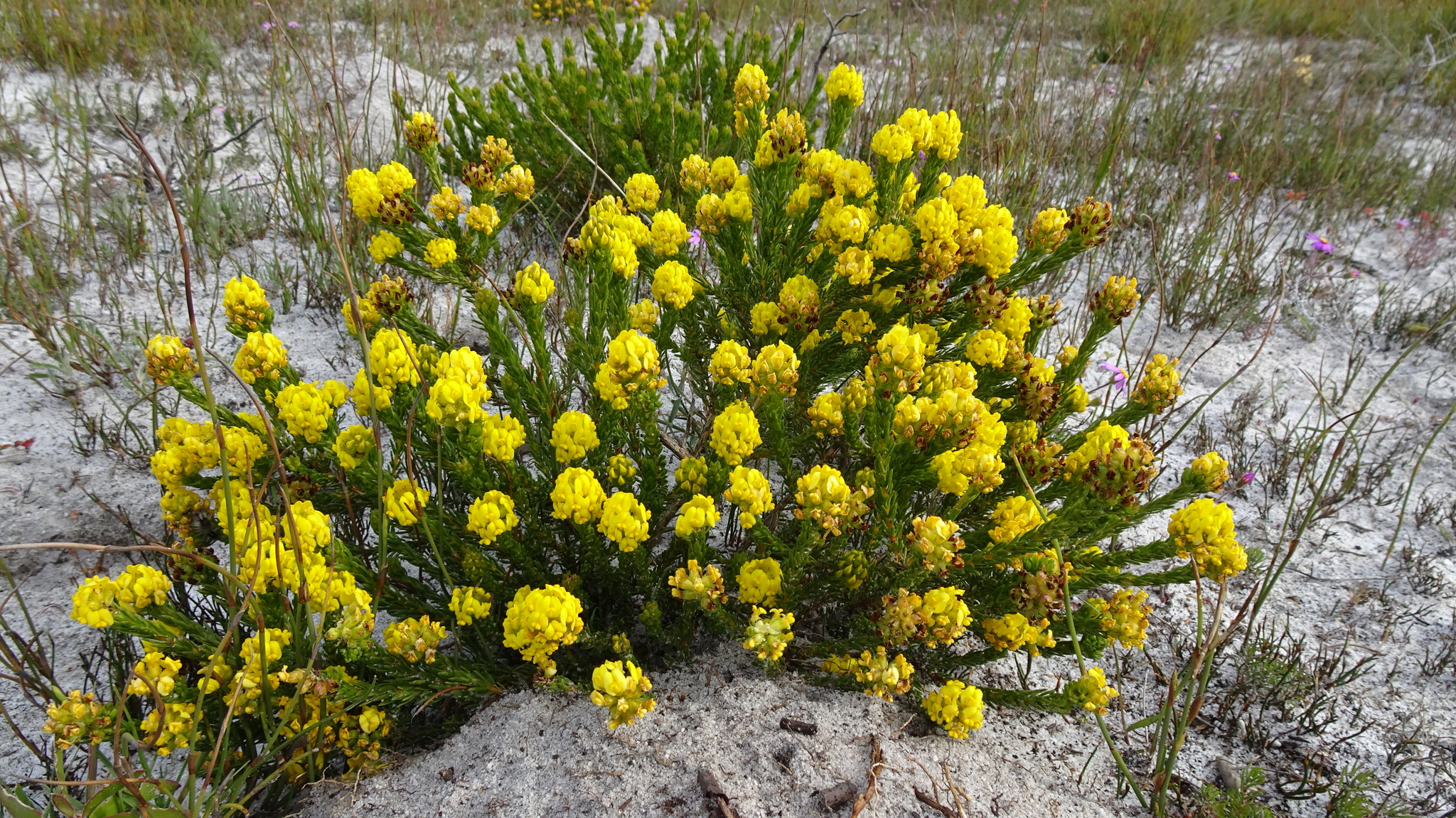

Scientific classification
- Kingdom: Plantae
- Clade: Tracheophytes
- Clade: Angiosperms
- Clade: Eudicots
- Clade: Rosids
- Order: Fabales
- Family: Fabaceae
- Subfamily: Faboideae
- Genus: Aspalathus
- Species: A. callosa

Binomial name
- Aspalathus callosa L.

Synonyms
- Achyronia callosa (L.) Kuntze; Paraspalathus callosa (L.) C.Presl; Paraspalathus fagonioides C.Presl

= Aspalathus callosa =

Species of plant

Aspalathus callosa, the honeybush Capegorse, is a small to medium-sized shrub belonging to the family Fabaceae. The species is endemic to the Western Cape and forms part of the fynbos. It occurs in the Cape Peninsula up to Bredasdorp, has a range of 23 087 km² and the total population is currently stable.
