= Aspalathus securifolia =

Scientific classification
- Kingdom: Plantae
- Clade: Tracheophytes
- Clade: Angiosperms
- Clade: Eudicots
- Clade: Rosids
- Order: Fabales
- Family: Fabaceae
- Subfamily: Faboideae
- Genus: Aspalathus
- Species: A. securifolia

Binomial name
- Aspalathus securifolia Eckl. & Zeyh.

Synonyms
- Achyronia exigua (Eckl. & Zeyh.) Kuntze; Achyronia securifolia (Eckl. & Zeyh.) Kuntze; Aspalathus conferta Benth.; Aspalathus exigua Eckl. & Zeyh.; Aspalathus spathulata Eckl. & Zeyh.; Paraspalathus securifolia (Eckl. & Zeyh.) Walp.; Paraspalathus spathulata (Eckl. & Zeyh.) C.Presl

Species of plant

Aspalathus securifolia is a shrub belonging to the family Fabaceae. The species is endemic to the Western Cape and occurs from Bainskloof to the Babilonstoring Mountains and eastwards to the Langeberg north of Albertinia. It is part of the fynbos.
