= Aspalathus sericea =

Scientific classification
- Kingdom: Plantae
- Clade: Tracheophytes
- Clade: Angiosperms
- Clade: Eudicots
- Clade: Rosids
- Order: Fabales
- Family: Fabaceae
- Subfamily: Faboideae
- Genus: Aspalathus
- Species: A. sericea

Binomial name
- Aspalathus sericea P.J.Bergius

Synonyms
- Achyronia sericea (P.J.Bergius) Kuntze; Aspalathus argentea J.F.Gmel.; Paraspalathus sericea (P.J.Bergius) C.Presl

Species of plant

Aspalathus sericea, the silky Capegorse, is a small to medium-sized shrub belonging to the genus Aspalathus. The species is endemic to the Western Cape and forms part of the fynbos. It occurs from Hopefield to Agulhas. The species has lost some of its habitat on the Cape Flats and the West Coast to crop cultivation and development, but currently the population numbers are stable.
