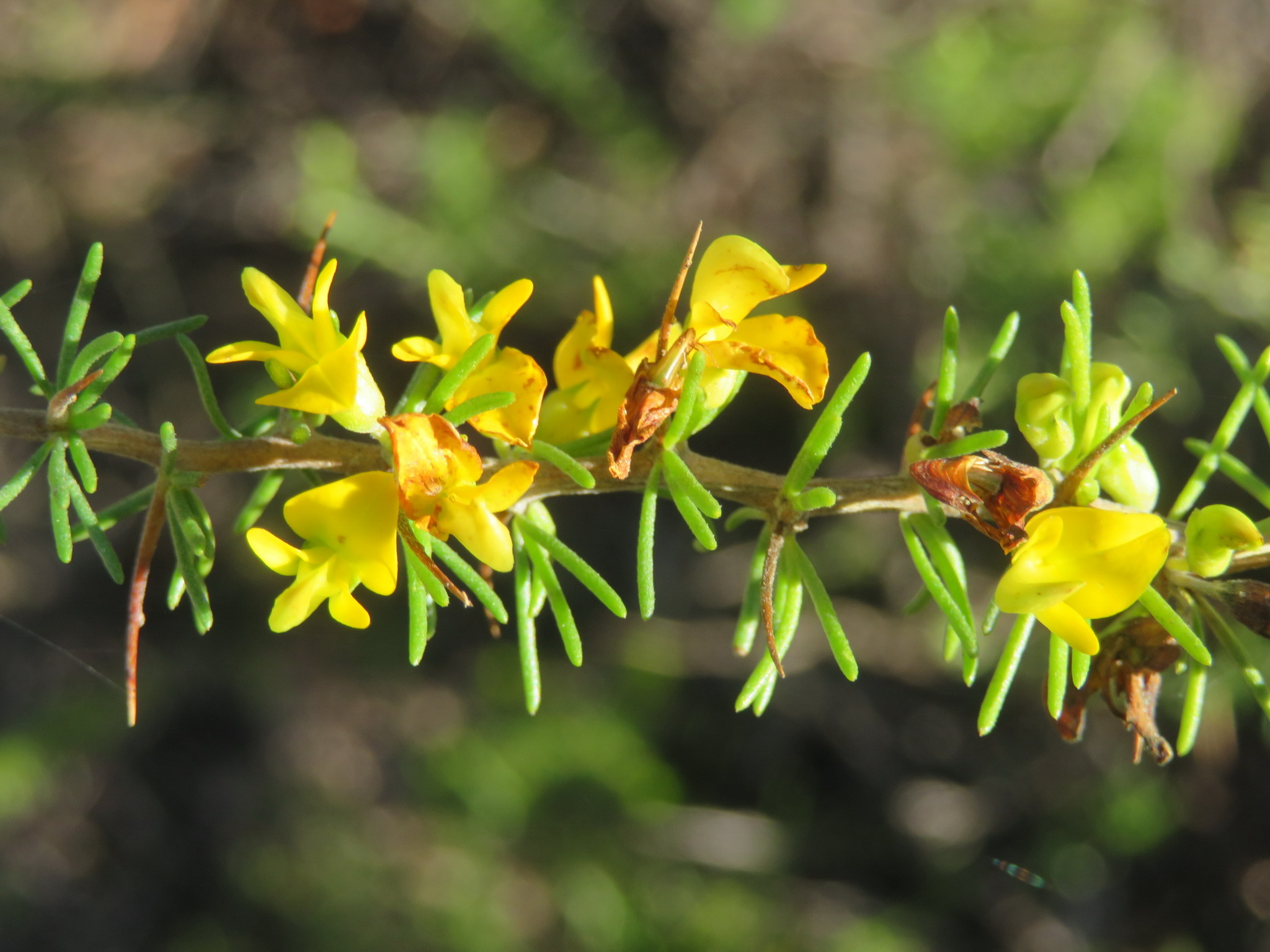

Scientific classification
- Kingdom: Plantae
- Clade: Tracheophytes
- Clade: Angiosperms
- Clade: Eudicots
- Clade: Rosids
- Order: Fabales
- Family: Fabaceae
- Subfamily: Faboideae
- Genus: Aspalathus
- Species: A. spinosa

Binomial name
- Aspalathus spinosa L.

Synonyms
- Achyronia spinosa (L.) Kuntze; Diallosperma spinosa (L.) Raf.

= Aspalathus spinosa =

Species of plant

Aspalathus spinosa, the dancing thorn and common spiny Capegorse, is a shrub belonging to the family Fabaceae. The species is endemic to KwaZulu-Natal, Northern Cape, Eastern Cape and the Western Cape.

The species has three subspecies:

- Aspalathus spinosa subsp. flavispina (C.Presl ex Benth.) R.Dahlgren
- Aspalathus spinosa subsp. glauca (Eckl. & Zeyh.) R.Dahlgren
- Aspalathus spinosa subsp. spinosa
