= Aspalathus rostrata =

Scientific classification
- Kingdom: Plantae
- Clade: Tracheophytes
- Clade: Angiosperms
- Clade: Eudicots
- Clade: Rosids
- Order: Fabales
- Family: Fabaceae
- Subfamily: Faboideae
- Genus: Aspalathus
- Species: A. rostrata

Binomial name
- Aspalathus rostrata Benth.

Synonyms
- Achyronia rostrata (Benth.) Kuntze

Species of plant

Aspalathus rostrata is a shrub belonging to the family Fabaceae. The species is endemic to the Western Cape and is part of the fynbos and renosterveld vegetation. It occurs from the Hex River Pass to the northern slopes of the Langeberg in the Koo Valley, west of Montagu. The plant is considered rare.
