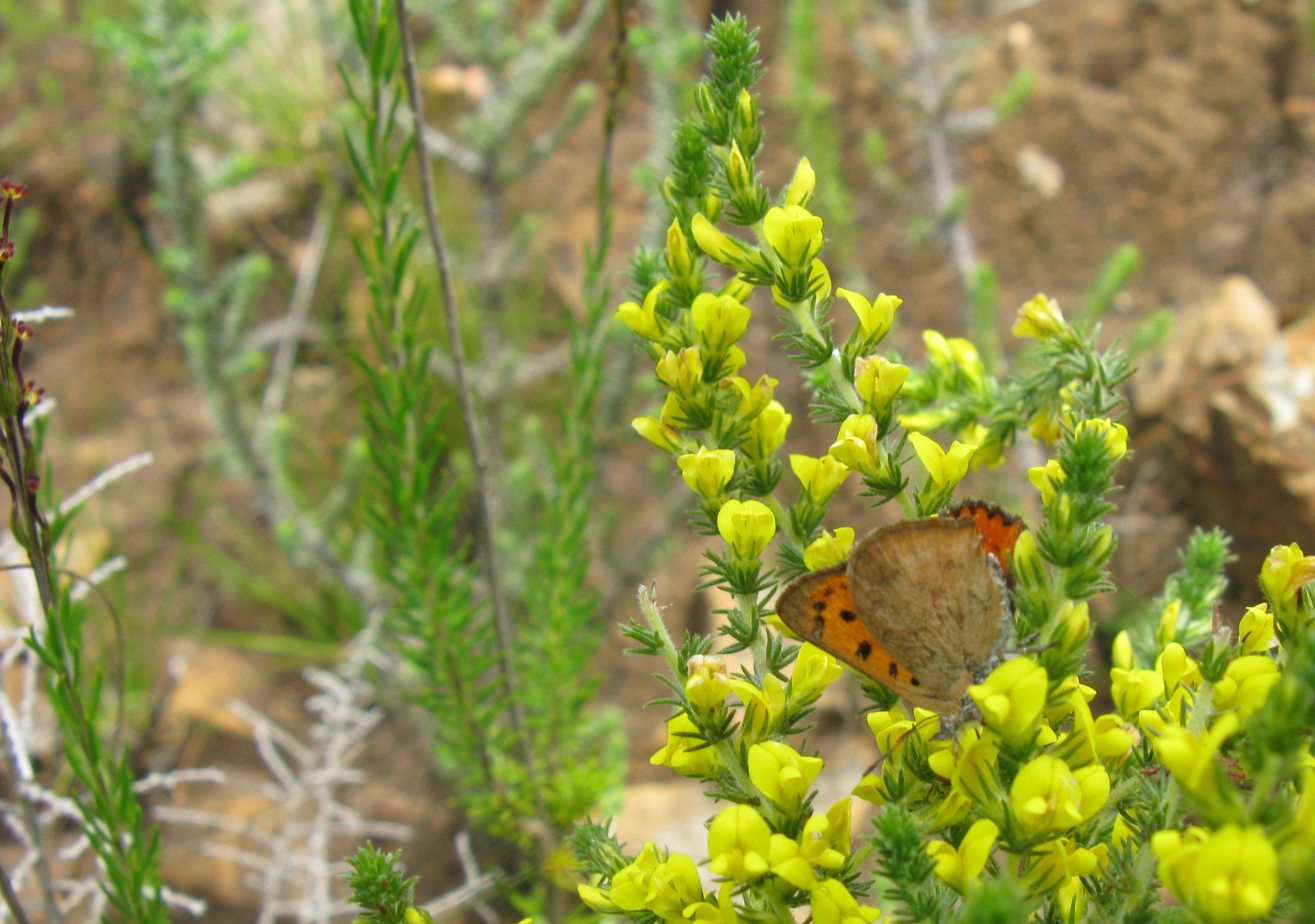

Scientific classification
- Kingdom: Plantae
- Clade: Tracheophytes
- Clade: Angiosperms
- Clade: Eudicots
- Clade: Rosids
- Order: Fabales
- Family: Fabaceae
- Subfamily: Faboideae
- Genus: Aspalathus
- Species: A. ericifolia

Binomial name
- Aspalathus ericifolia L.

Synonyms
- Achyronia ericifolia (L.) Kuntze; Paraspalathus ericifolia (L.) C.Presl

= Aspalathus ericifolia =

Species of plant

Aspalathus ericifolia is a shrub belonging to the family Fabaceae. The species is native to the Northern, Eastern and Western Cape provinces and is part of the fynbos.

The plant has three subspecies:

- Aspalathus ericifolia subsp. ericifolia
- Aspalathus ericifolia subsp. minuta R.Dahlgren
- Aspalathus ericifolia subsp. pusilla R.Dahlgren
