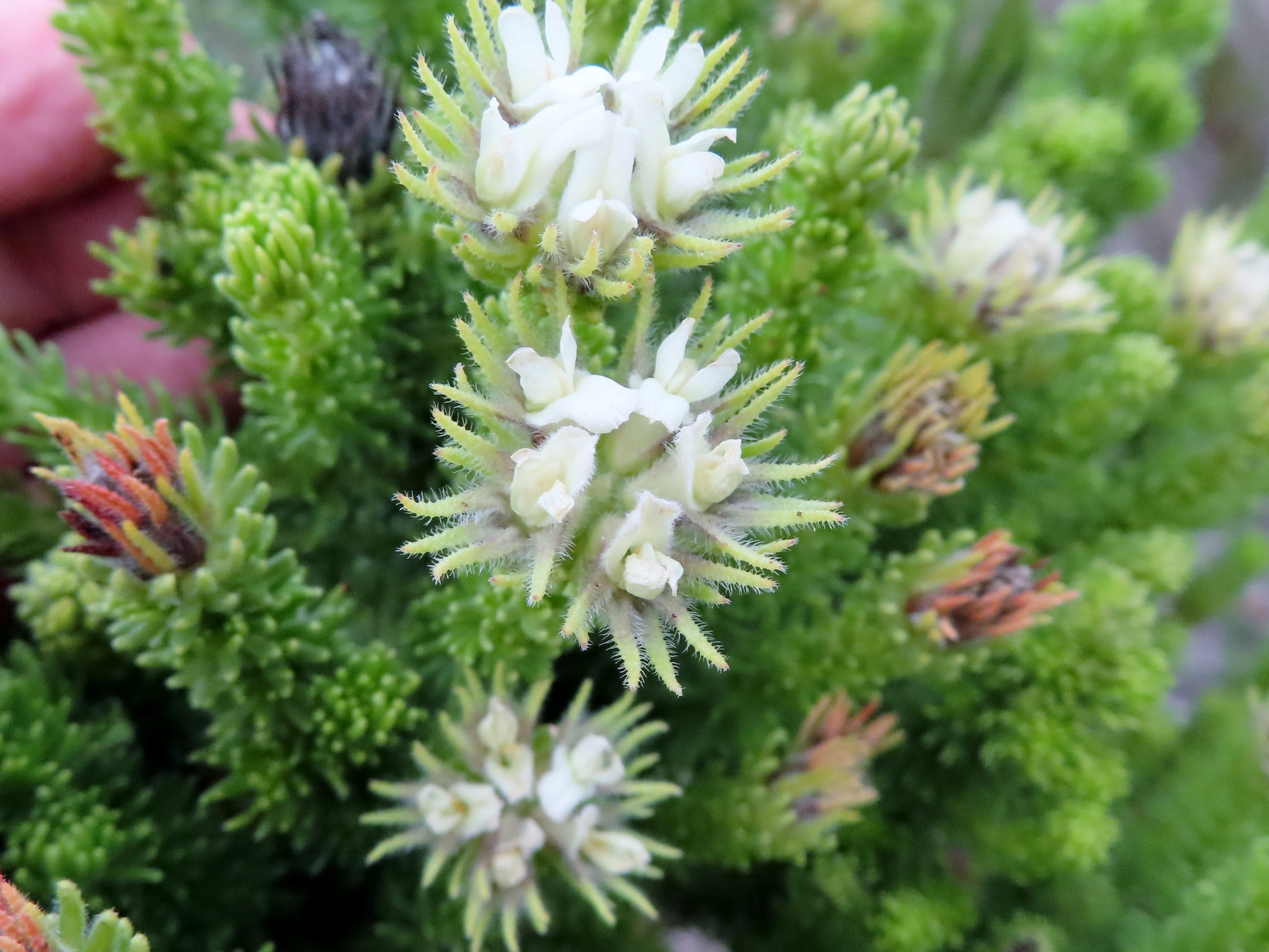

Scientific classification
- Kingdom: Plantae
- Clade: Tracheophytes
- Clade: Angiosperms
- Clade: Eudicots
- Clade: Rosids
- Order: Fabales
- Family: Fabaceae
- Subfamily: Faboideae
- Genus: Aspalathus
- Species: A. forbesii

Binomial name
- Aspalathus forbesii Harv.

Synonyms
- Achyronia forbesii (Harv.) Kuntze; Achyronia priorii (Harv.) Kuntze; Aspalathus cephalotes Benth.; Aspalathus priorii Harv.

= Aspalathus forbesii =

Species of plant

Aspalathus forbesii is a plant belonging to the genus Aspalathus. The species is endemic to the Western Cape and is part of the coastal fynbos where it grows mainly on coastal dunes. It occurs from the Cape Peninsula to Still Bay.
