= Aspalathus capensis =

Scientific classification
- Kingdom: Plantae
- Clade: Tracheophytes
- Clade: Angiosperms
- Clade: Eudicots
- Clade: Rosids
- Order: Fabales
- Family: Fabaceae
- Subfamily: Faboideae
- Genus: Aspalathus
- Species: A. capensis

Binomial name
- Aspalathus capensis (Walp.) R.Dahlgren

Synonyms
- Achyronia sarcodes (Vogel ex Walp.) Kuntze; Aspalathus sarcodes Vogel ex Walp.; Sarcocalyx capensis Walp.; Sarcophyllus carnosus Thunb.

Species of plant

Aspalathus capensis, commonly known as the Cape Capegorse, is a shrub belonging to the genus Aspalathus. The species is endemic to the Western Cape and is part of the fynbos. It occurs in the Table Mountain National Park where it is protected. The plant has an area of occurrence of 185 km^{2} and is considered rare.
