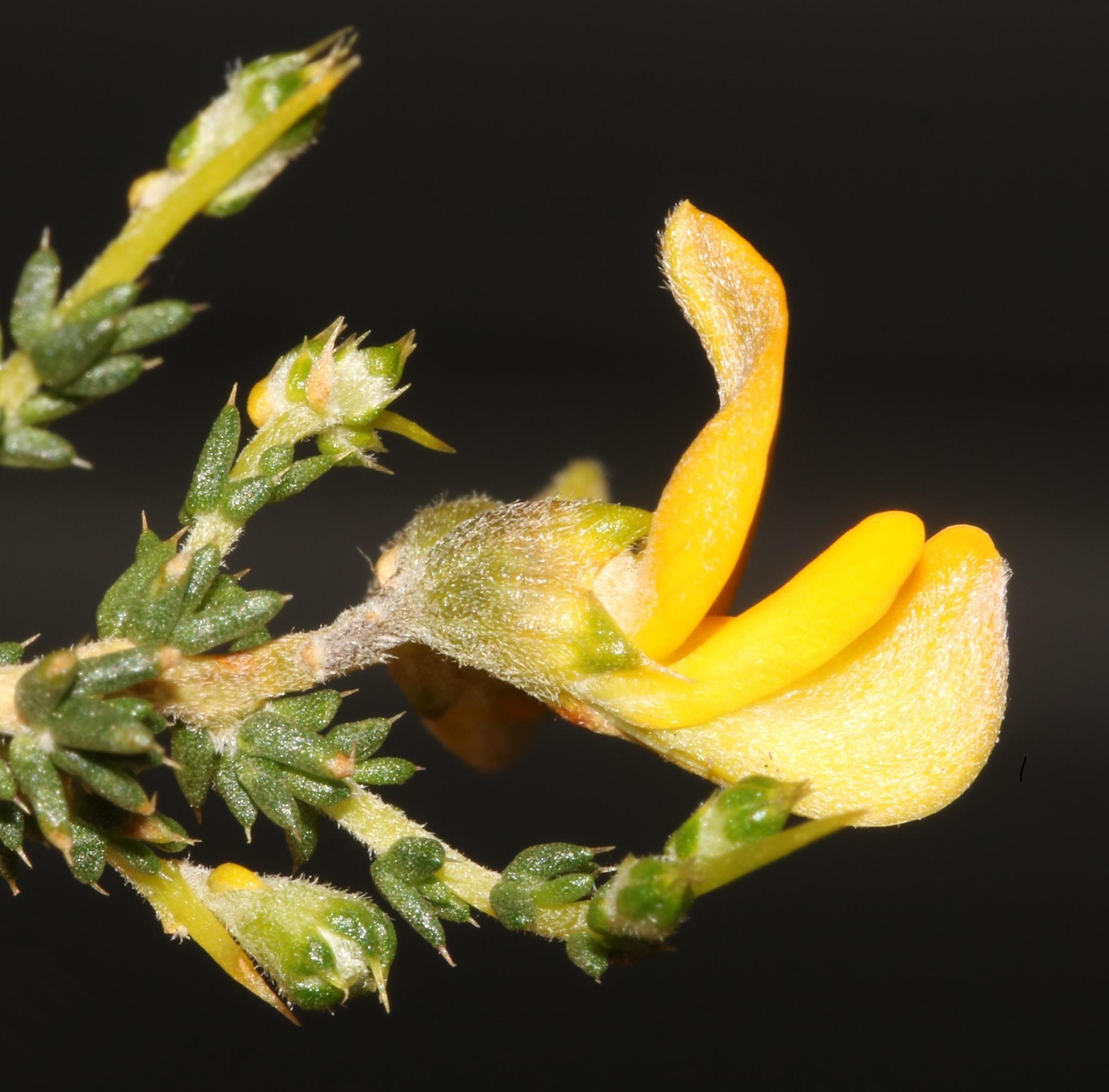

Scientific classification
- Kingdom: Plantae
- Clade: Tracheophytes
- Clade: Angiosperms
- Clade: Eudicots
- Clade: Rosids
- Order: Fabales
- Family: Fabaceae
- Subfamily: Faboideae
- Genus: Aspalathus
- Species: A. acuminata

Binomial name
- Aspalathus acuminata Lam.

Synonyms
- Achyronia acuminata (Lam.) Kuntze

= Aspalathus acuminata =

Species of plant

Aspalathus acuminata, the longtip Capegorse, is a small to medium-sized shrub belonging to the family Fabaceae. The species is endemic to the Western Cape and is part of the fynbos.

The species has two subspecies:

- Aspalathus acuminata subsp. acuminata
- Aspalathus acuminata subsp. pungens (Thunb.) R.Dahlgren
