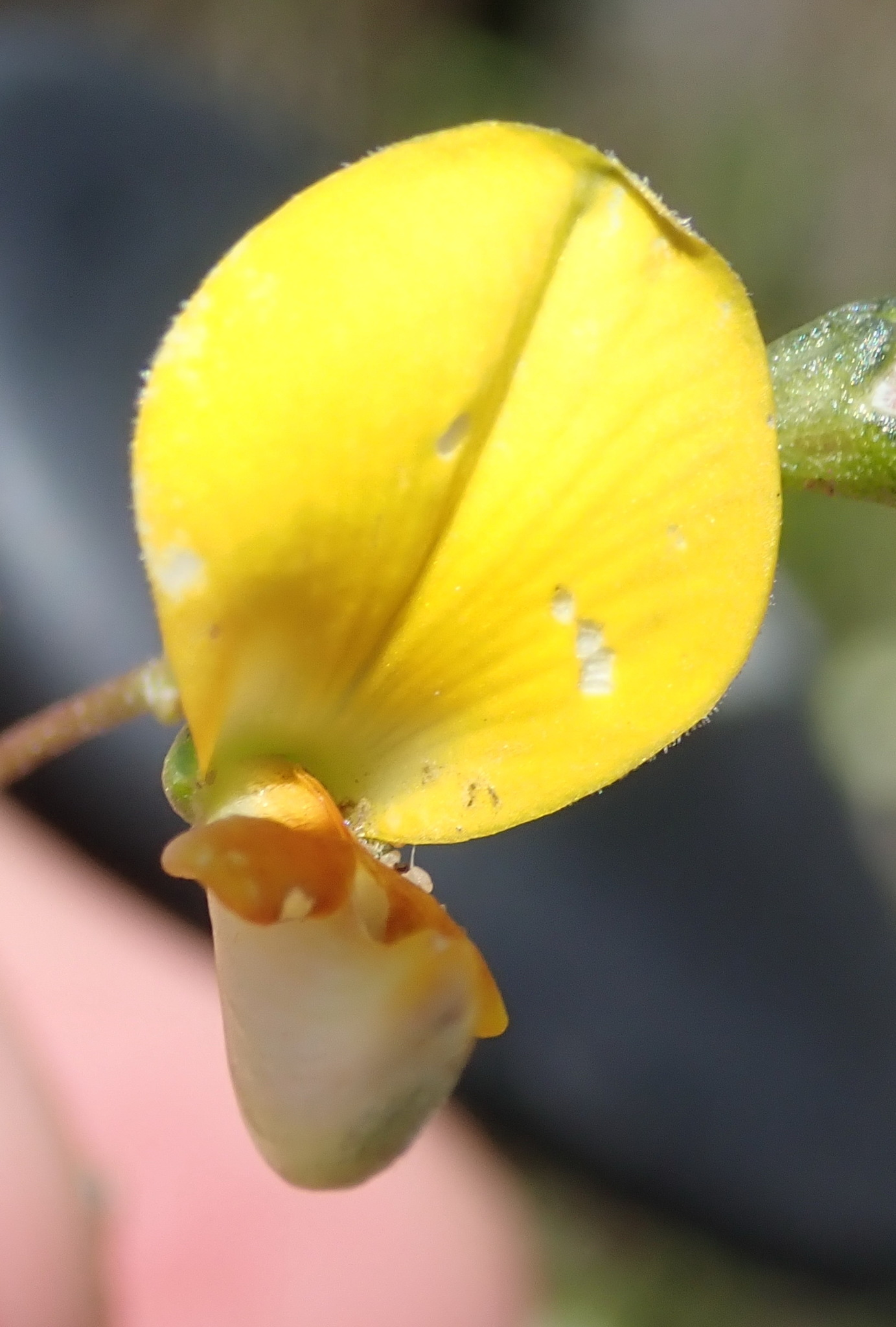

Scientific classification
- Kingdom: Plantae
- Clade: Tracheophytes
- Clade: Angiosperms
- Clade: Eudicots
- Clade: Rosids
- Order: Fabales
- Family: Fabaceae
- Subfamily: Faboideae
- Genus: Aspalathus
- Species: A. biflora

Binomial name
- Aspalathus biflora E.Mey.

= Aspalathus biflora =

Species of plant

Aspalathus biflora is a small to medium-sized shrub belonging to the family Fabaceae. The species is endemic to the Eastern Cape and Western Cape and forms part of the fynbos.

The species has two subspecies:

- Aspalathus biflora subsp. biflora
- Aspalathus biflora subsp. longicarpa R.Dahlgren
