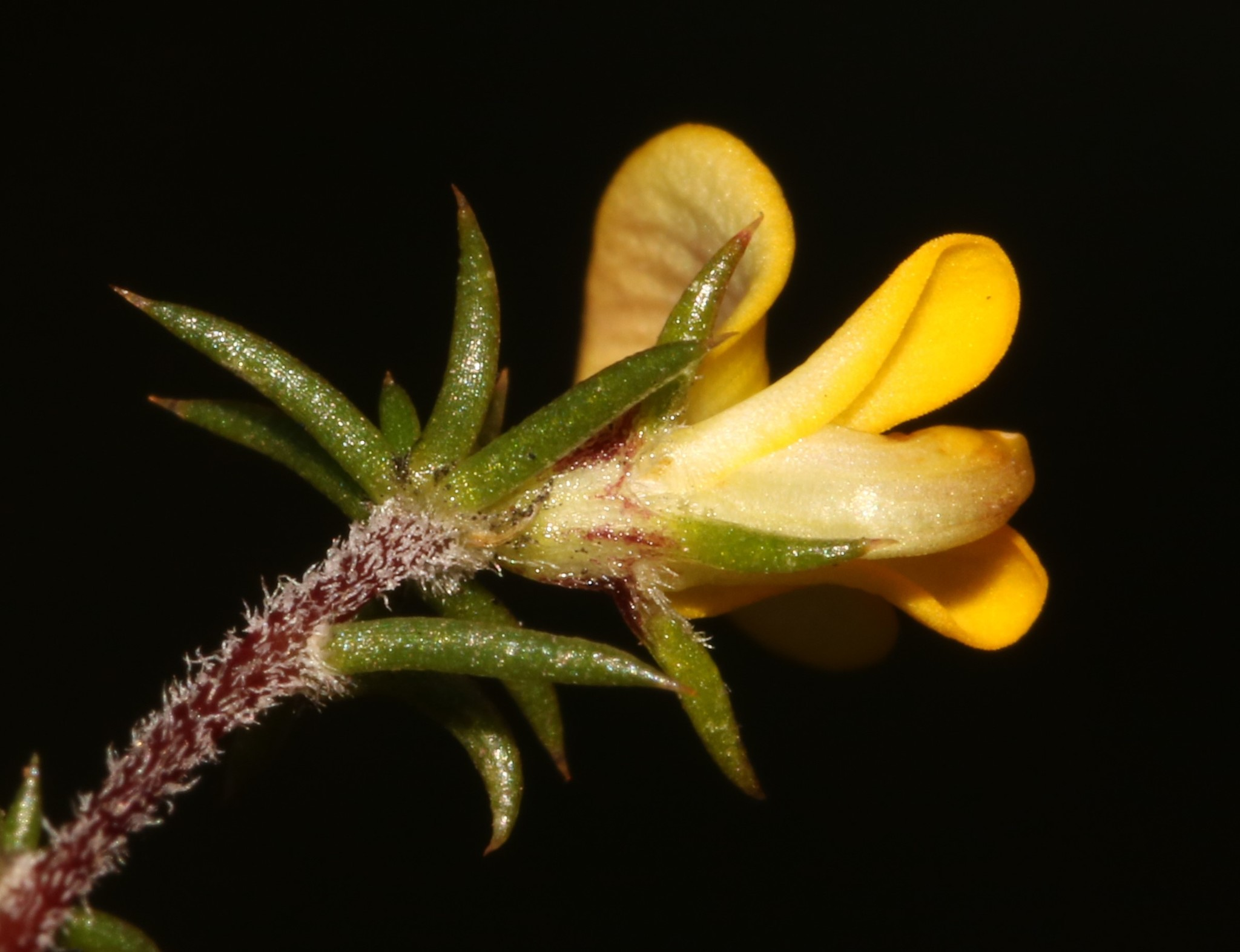

Conservation status
- Extinct (SANBI Red List)

Scientific classification
- Kingdom: Plantae
- Clade: Tracheophytes
- Clade: Angiosperms
- Clade: Eudicots
- Clade: Rosids
- Order: Fabales
- Family: Fabaceae
- Subfamily: Faboideae
- Genus: Aspalathus
- Species: †A. cordicarpa

Binomial name
- †Aspalathus cordicarpa R.Dahlgren

= Aspalathus cordicarpa =

Species of flowering plant

Aspalathus cordicarpa is a species of flowering plant in the family Fabaceae. Prior to its rediscovery in 2016, Aspalathus cordicarpa was last collected in 1950 and thought to be extinct. It is endemic to the Fynbos region around Garcia's Pass in the Western Cape. It is also known as the Heartfruit Capegorse.

== Distribution ==
Aspalathus cordicarpa is found around Garcia's Pass, in sands or sandstone gravel at mid altitudes.

== Gallery ==
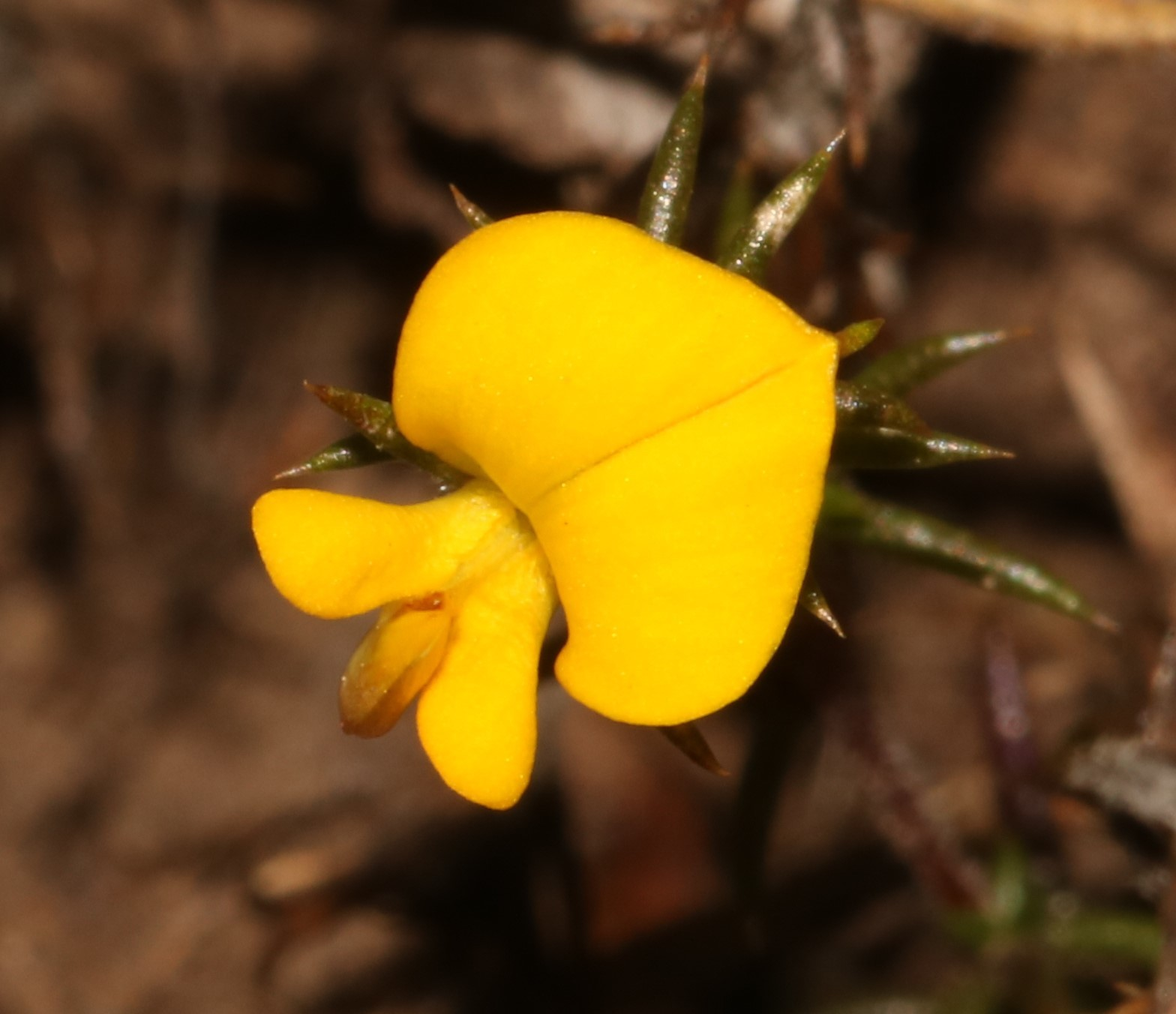

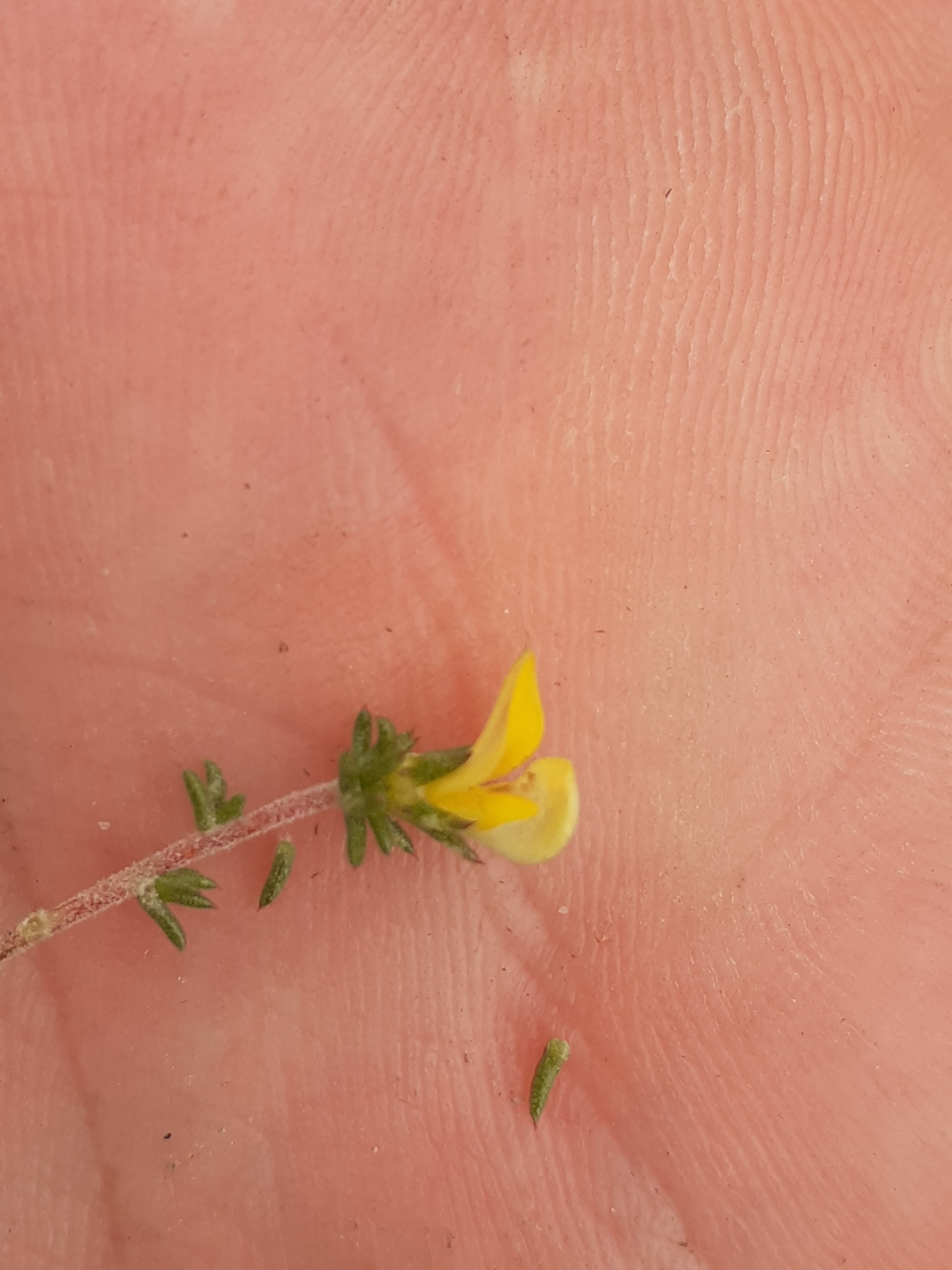

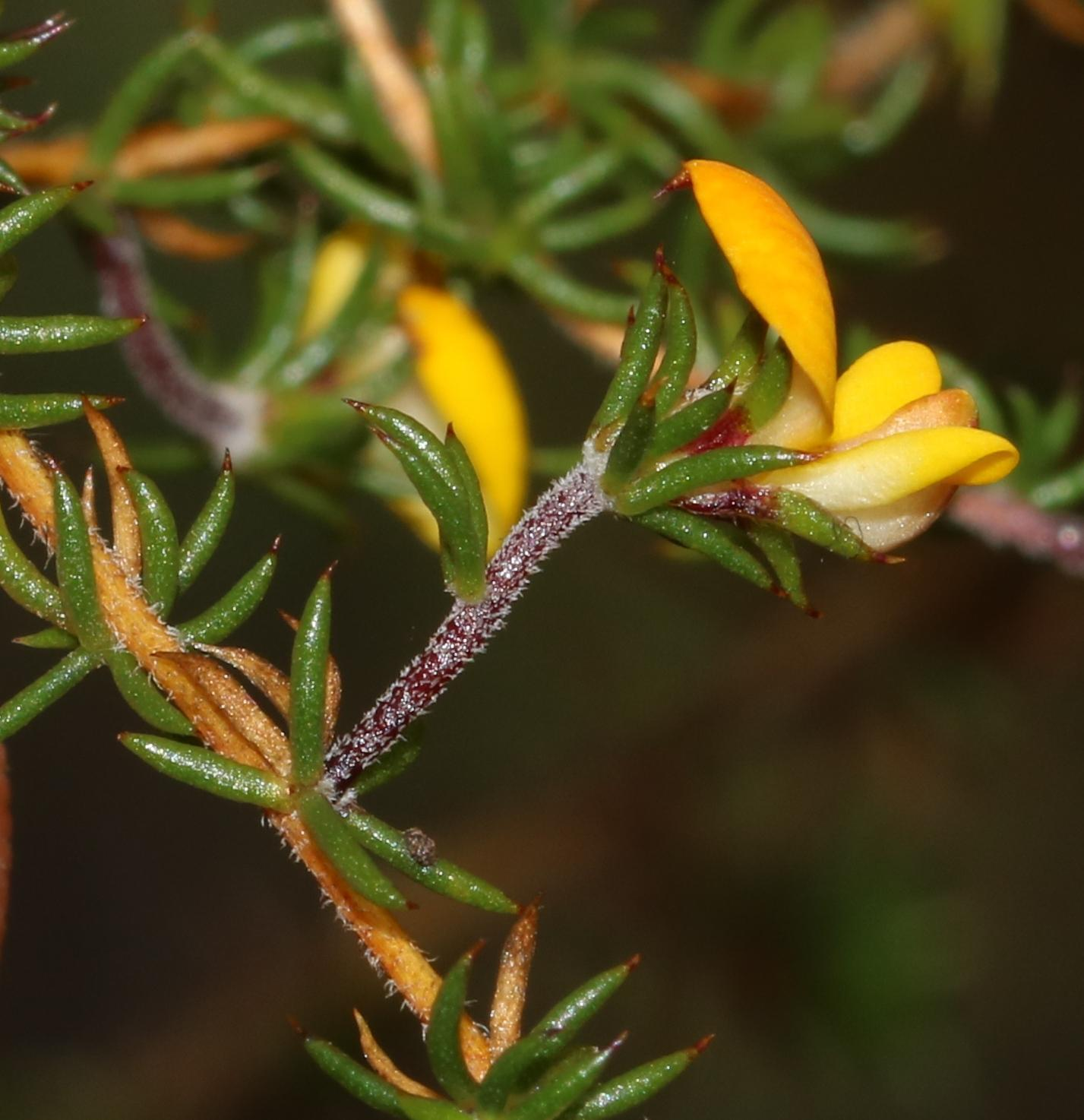

== Conservation status ==
As of the 2006 classification, Aspalathus cordicarpa is classified as Extinct. Alien species such as Acacia mearnsii are a severe past and present threat. Pine plantations are also a threat, as the area that Aspalathus cordicarpa is found in has been transformed into pine forestry.
