= Aspalathus quinquefolia =

Scientific classification
- Kingdom: Plantae
- Clade: Tracheophytes
- Clade: Angiosperms
- Clade: Eudicots
- Clade: Rosids
- Order: Fabales
- Family: Fabaceae
- Subfamily: Faboideae
- Genus: Aspalathus
- Species: A. quinquefolia

Binomial name
- Aspalathus quinquefolia L.

Species of plant

Aspalathus quinquefolia, the fiveleaf Capegorse, is a small to medium-sized shrub belonging to the family Fabaceae. The species is endemic to the Western Cape and is part of the fynbos.

The species has subspecies:

- Aspalathus quinquefolia subsp. compacta R.Dahlgren
- Aspalathus quinquefolia subsp. quinquefolia
- Aspalathus quinquefolia subsp. virgata (Thunb.) R.Dahlgren
