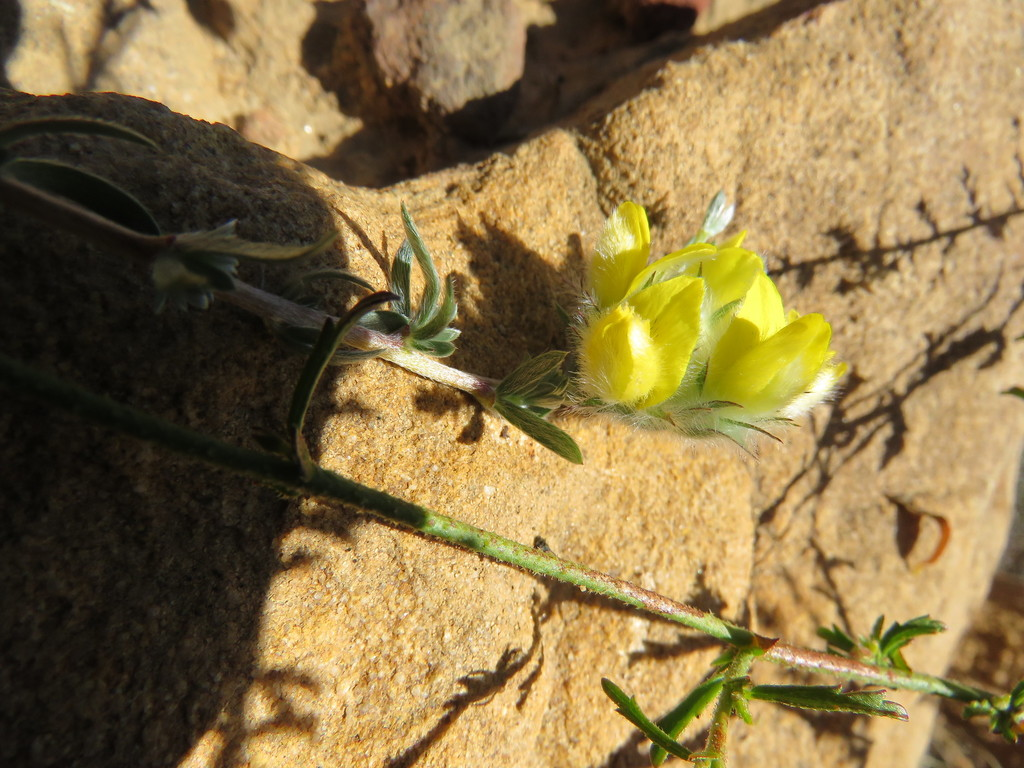

Scientific classification
- Kingdom: Plantae
- Clade: Tracheophytes
- Clade: Angiosperms
- Clade: Eudicots
- Clade: Rosids
- Order: Fabales
- Family: Fabaceae
- Subfamily: Faboideae
- Genus: Aspalathus
- Species: A. tridentata

Binomial name
- Aspalathus tridentata L.

Synonyms
- Achyronia tridentata (L.) Kuntze

= Aspalathus tridentata =

Species of plant

Aspalathus tridentata, the trident Capegorse, is a small to medium shrub belonging to the family Fabaceae. The species is endemic to the Northern Cape and Western Cape and occurs from the Cederberg to the Cape Peninsula and eastwards to Swellendam and is part of the fynbos.

The species has four subspecies:

- Aspalathus tridentata subsp. fragilis R.Dahlgren
- Aspalathus tridentata subsp. rotunda R.Dahlgren
- Aspalathus tridentata subsp. staurantha (Eckl. & Zeyh.) R.Dahlgren
- Aspalathus tridentata subsp. tridentata
