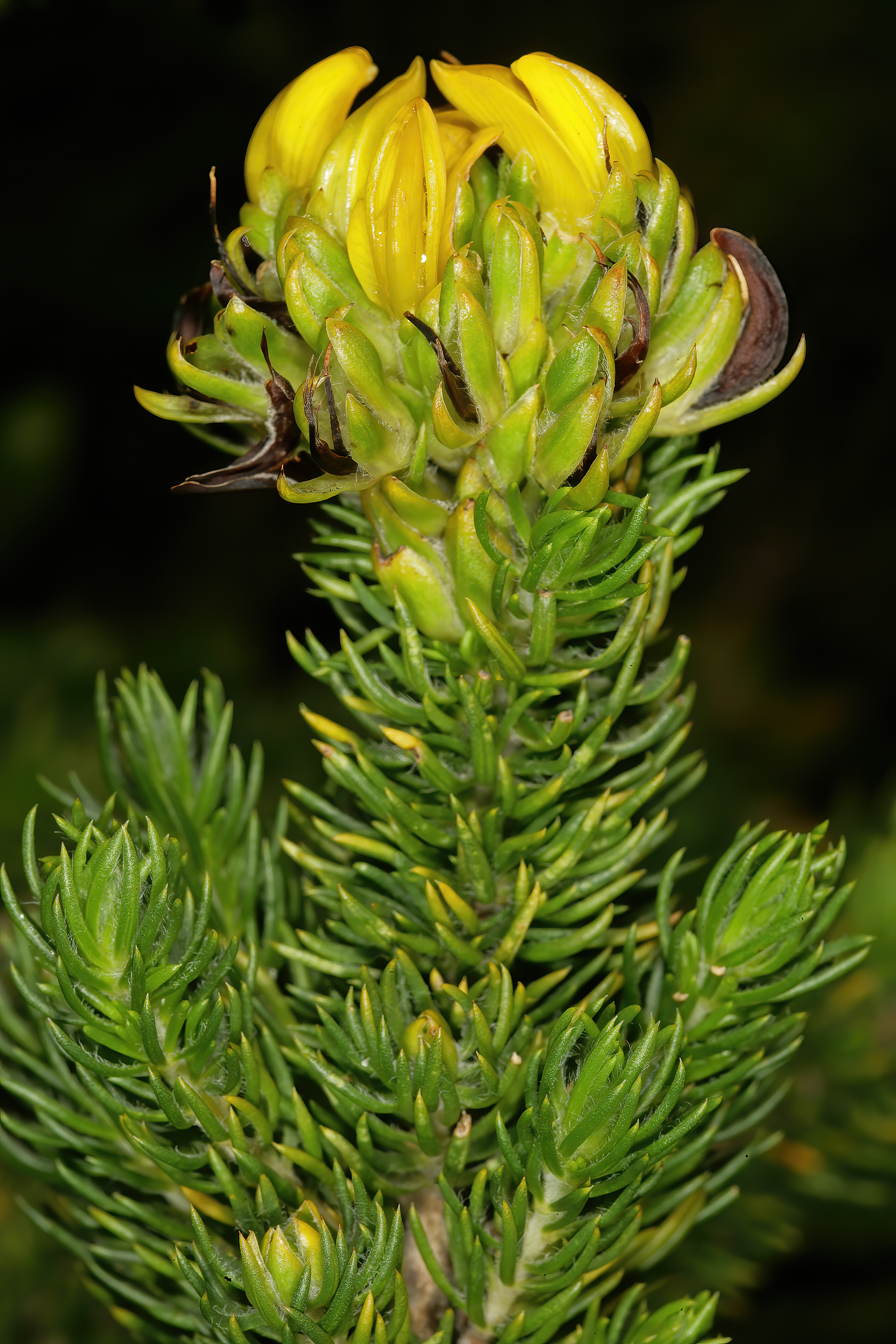

Scientific classification
- Kingdom: Plantae
- Clade: Tracheophytes
- Clade: Angiosperms
- Clade: Eudicots
- Clade: Rosids
- Order: Fabales
- Family: Fabaceae
- Subfamily: Faboideae
- Genus: Aspalathus
- Species: A. capitata

Binomial name
- Aspalathus capitata L.

Synonyms
- Achyronia capitata (L.) Kuntze; Achyronia glomerata (L.f.) Kuntze; Aspalathus comosa Willd. ex Walp.; Aspalathus glomerata L.f.; Paraspalathus capitata (L.) C.Presl

= Aspalathus capitata =

Species of plant

Aspalathus capitata is a shrub or tree belonging to the family Fabaceae. The species is endemic to the Northern, Easternm and Western Cape provinces and forms part of the fynbos. It occurs in the Cape Peninsula, Table Mountain, Constantiaberg and Muizenberg, has a distribution area of 187 km^{2} (72 sq mi) and the total population is less than 1000 plants.
