= Aspalathus retroflexa =

Scientific classification
- Kingdom: Plantae
- Clade: Tracheophytes
- Clade: Angiosperms
- Clade: Eudicots
- Clade: Rosids
- Order: Fabales
- Family: Fabaceae
- Subfamily: Faboideae
- Genus: Aspalathus
- Species: A. retroflexa

Binomial name
- Aspalathus retroflexa L.

Synonyms
- Achyronia retroflexa (L.) Kuntze

Species of plant

Aspalathus retroflexa is a small to medium-sized shrub belonging to the family Fabaceae. The species is endemic to the Western Cape and is part of the fynbos vegetation. It occurs from the Wemmershoek Mountains to the Cape Peninsula, Hangklip and Agulhas but not on the Cape Flats. It has a distribution area of 9586 km².

The species has three subspecies:

- Aspalathus retroflexa subsp. angustipetala R.Dahlgren
- Aspalathus retroflexa subsp. bicolor (Eckl. & Zeyh.) R.Dahlgren
- Aspalathus retroflexa subsp. retroflexa
