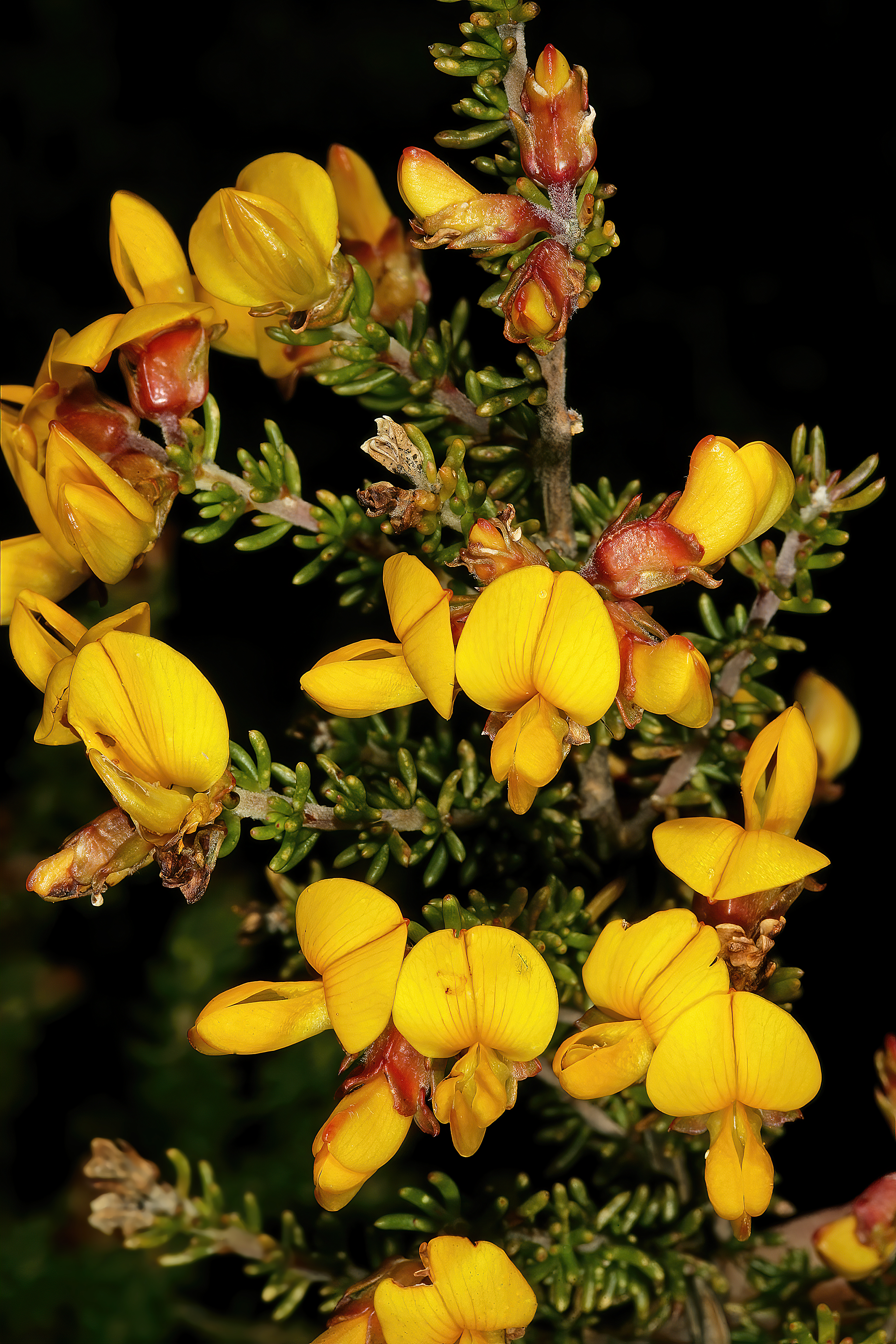

Conservation status
- Least Concern (SANBI Red List)

Scientific classification
- Kingdom: Plantae
- Clade: Tracheophytes
- Clade: Angiosperms
- Clade: Eudicots
- Clade: Rosids
- Order: Fabales
- Family: Fabaceae
- Subfamily: Faboideae
- Genus: Aspalathus
- Species: A. carnosa

Binomial name
- Aspalathus carnosa P.J.Bergius

Synonyms
- Achyronia carnosa (P.J.Bergius) Kuntze; Achyronia sarcantha (Vogel ex Walp.) Kuntze; Aspalathus carnosa L.; Aspalathus sarcantha Vogel ex Walp.; Paraspalathus carnosa (P.J.Bergius) C.Presl

= Aspalathus carnosa =

Species of flowering plant

Aspalathus carnosa, commonly known as the fleshy capegorse or cat's tail fynbos, is a shrub belonging to the Fabaceae family. The species is endemic to the Western Cape of South Africa and forms part of the fynbos. It occurs from the Cape Peninsula to the mouth of the Palmiet River.
