= Aspalathus abietina =

Scientific classification
- Kingdom: Plantae
- Clade: Tracheophytes
- Clade: Angiosperms
- Clade: Eudicots
- Clade: Rosids
- Order: Fabales
- Family: Fabaceae
- Subfamily: Faboideae
- Genus: Aspalathus
- Species: A. abietina

Binomial name
- Aspalathus abietina Thunb.

Synonyms
- Achyronia abietina (Thunb.) Kuntze; Achyronia fornicata (Benth.) Kuntze; Aspalathus filifolia E.Mey.; Aspalathus fornicata Benth.; Aspalathus retroflexa Eckl. & Zeyh.; Paraspalathus crocea C.Presl

Species of plant

Aspalathus abietina, commonly known as the fir Capegorse, is a small to medium-sized shrub belonging to the family Fabaceae. The species is endemic to the Western Cape and occurs from Wolseley to the Cape Peninsula and southwards to the Anysberg in the Bredasdorp district. The plant has a range of 12 858 km^{2} and there are ten subpopulations. It has already lost habitat on the Cape Flats and the population is currently stable.
