= Aspalathus spinescens =

Scientific classification
- Kingdom: Plantae
- Clade: Tracheophytes
- Clade: Angiosperms
- Clade: Eudicots
- Clade: Rosids
- Order: Fabales
- Family: Fabaceae
- Subfamily: Faboideae
- Genus: Aspalathus
- Species: A. spinescens

Binomial name
- Aspalathus spinescens Thunb.

Synonyms
- Achyronia spinescens (Thunb.) Kuntze

Species of plant

Aspalathus spinescens is a shrub belonging to the family Fabaceae. The species is endemic to the Western Cape and forms part of the fynbos. The population is stable.

The species has two subspecies:

- Aspalathus spinescens subsp. lepida (E.Mey.) R.Dahlgren
- Aspalathus spinescens subsp. spinescens
