= Aspalathus longifolia =

Scientific classification
- Kingdom: Plantae
- Clade: Tracheophytes
- Clade: Angiosperms
- Clade: Eudicots
- Clade: Rosids
- Order: Fabales
- Family: Fabaceae
- Subfamily: Faboideae
- Genus: Aspalathus
- Species: A. longifolia

Binomial name
- Aspalathus longifolia Benth.

Synonyms
- Achyronia longifolia (Benth.) Kuntze

Species of plant

Aspalathus longifolia is a shrub belonging to the family Fabaceae. The species is endemic to the Western Cape and is part of the fynbos. It occurs in the Langeberg, from Garcia Pass to the Gourits River. It has a range of less than 200 km² and is threatened by invasive plants and overgrazing, especially after veld fires. The population is declining.
