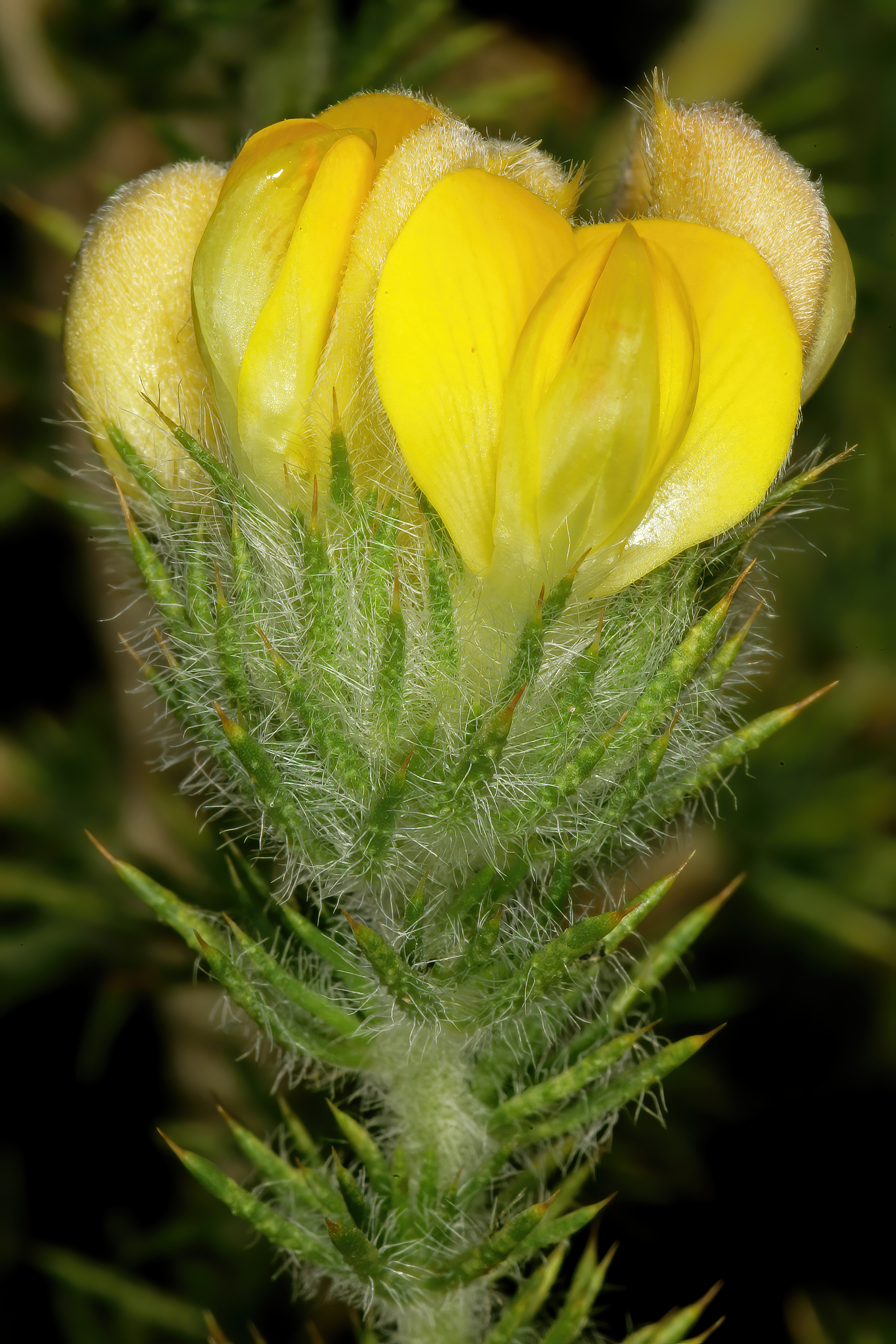

Scientific classification
- Kingdom: Plantae
- Clade: Tracheophytes
- Clade: Angiosperms
- Clade: Eudicots
- Clade: Rosids
- Order: Fabales
- Family: Fabaceae
- Subfamily: Faboideae
- Genus: Aspalathus
- Species: A. chenopoda

Binomial name
- Aspalathus chenopoda L.

Synonyms
- Achyronia chenopoda (L.) Kuntze; Aspalathus ciliaris Sims; Trineuria chenopoda (L.) C.Presl

= Aspalathus chenopoda =

Species of plant

Aspalathus chenopoda is a shrub belonging to the genus Aspalathus. The species is endemic to the Western Cape and forms part of the fynbos. It is found only in the Cape Peninsula, has a distribution area of 497 km² and is considered rare.
