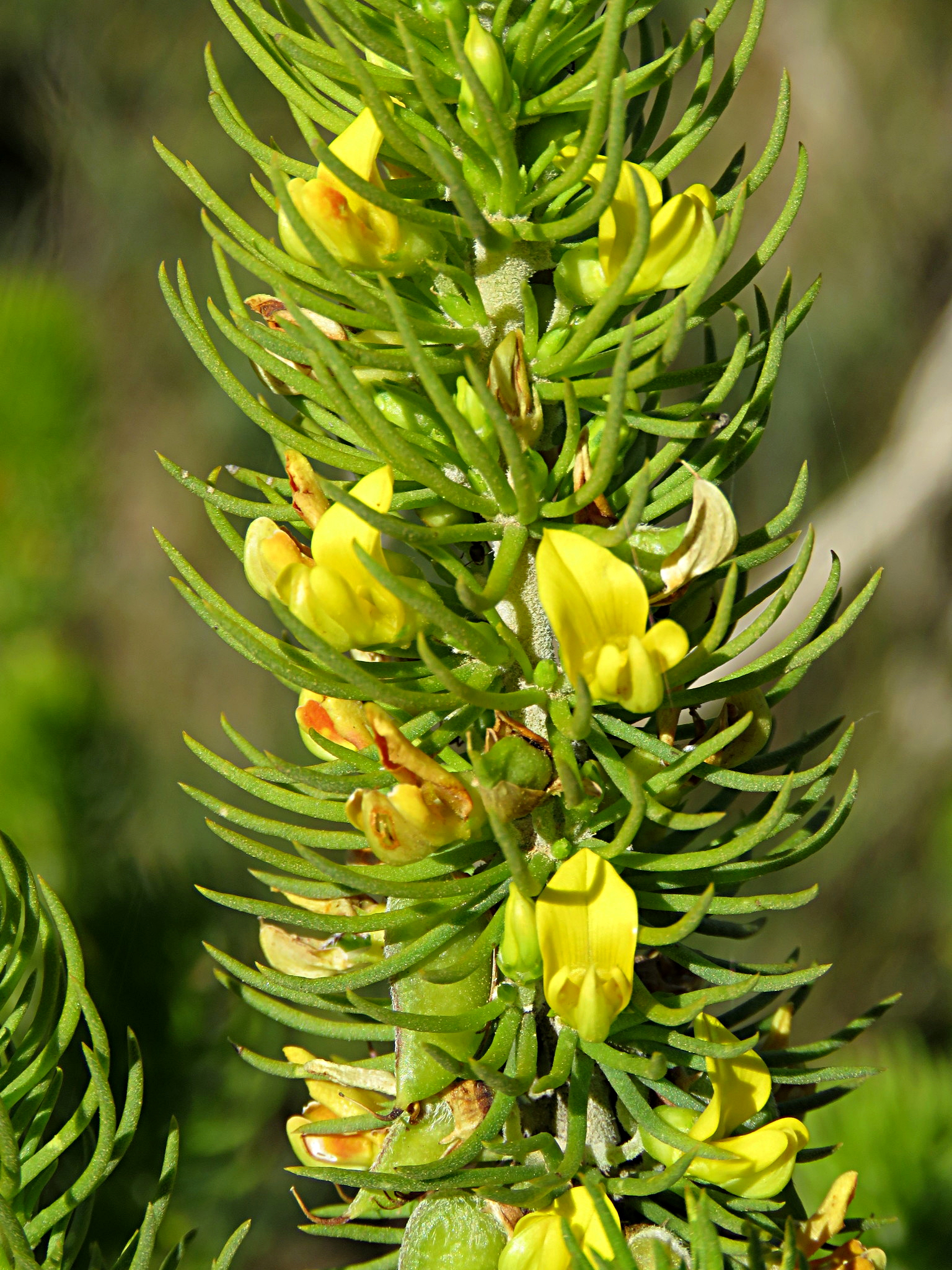

Scientific classification
- Kingdom: Plantae
- Clade: Tracheophytes
- Clade: Angiosperms
- Clade: Eudicots
- Clade: Rosids
- Order: Fabales
- Family: Fabaceae
- Subfamily: Faboideae
- Genus: Aspalathus
- Species: A. pinguis

Binomial name
- Aspalathus pinguis Thunb.

Synonyms
- Achyronia pinguis (Thunb.) Kuntze

= Aspalathus pinguis =

Species of plant

Aspalathus pinguis is a shrub belonging to the family Fabaceae. The species is endemic to the Western Cape and forms part of the fynbos. This plant occurs from Potberg to Ladismith and Uniondale and around Piketberg. The plant lost habitat to crop cultivation until 1960, but the population has been stable since then.

The species has four subspecies:

- Aspalathus pinguis subsp. australis R.Dahlgren
- Aspalathus pinguis subsp. longissima R.Dahlgren
- Aspalathus pinguis subsp. occidentalis R.Dahlgren
- Aspalathus pinguis subsp. pinguis
