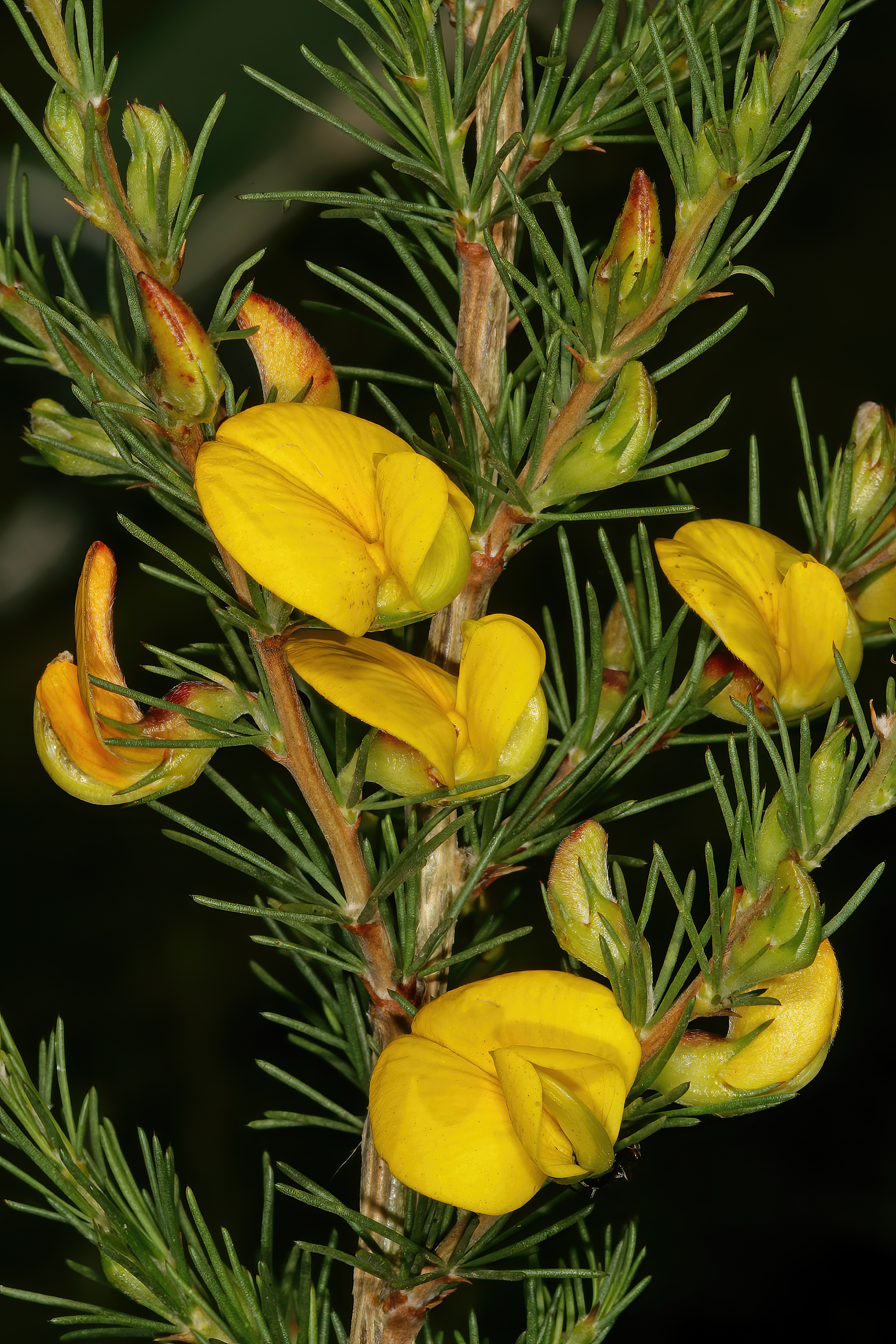

Scientific classification
- Kingdom: Plantae
- Clade: Tracheophytes
- Clade: Angiosperms
- Clade: Eudicots
- Clade: Rosids
- Order: Fabales
- Family: Fabaceae
- Subfamily: Faboideae
- Genus: Aspalathus
- Species: A. uniflora

Binomial name
- Aspalathus uniflora L.

Synonyms
- Achyronia leptophylla (Eckl. & Zeyh.) Kuntze; Achyronia uniflora (L.) Kuntze; Aspalathus ericifolia P.J.Bergius; Aspalathus hispida Sieber ex C.Presl; Aspalathus laricifolia Lam.; Aspalathus leptophylla Eckl. & Zeyh.; Trineuria cochleariformis C.Presl

= Aspalathus uniflora =

Species of plant

Aspalathus uniflora, the single Capegorse, is a shrub belonging to the family Fabaceae. The species is endemic to the Eastern Cape and the Western Cape, occurring from the Cederberg to the Cape Peninsula and is part of the fynbos.
