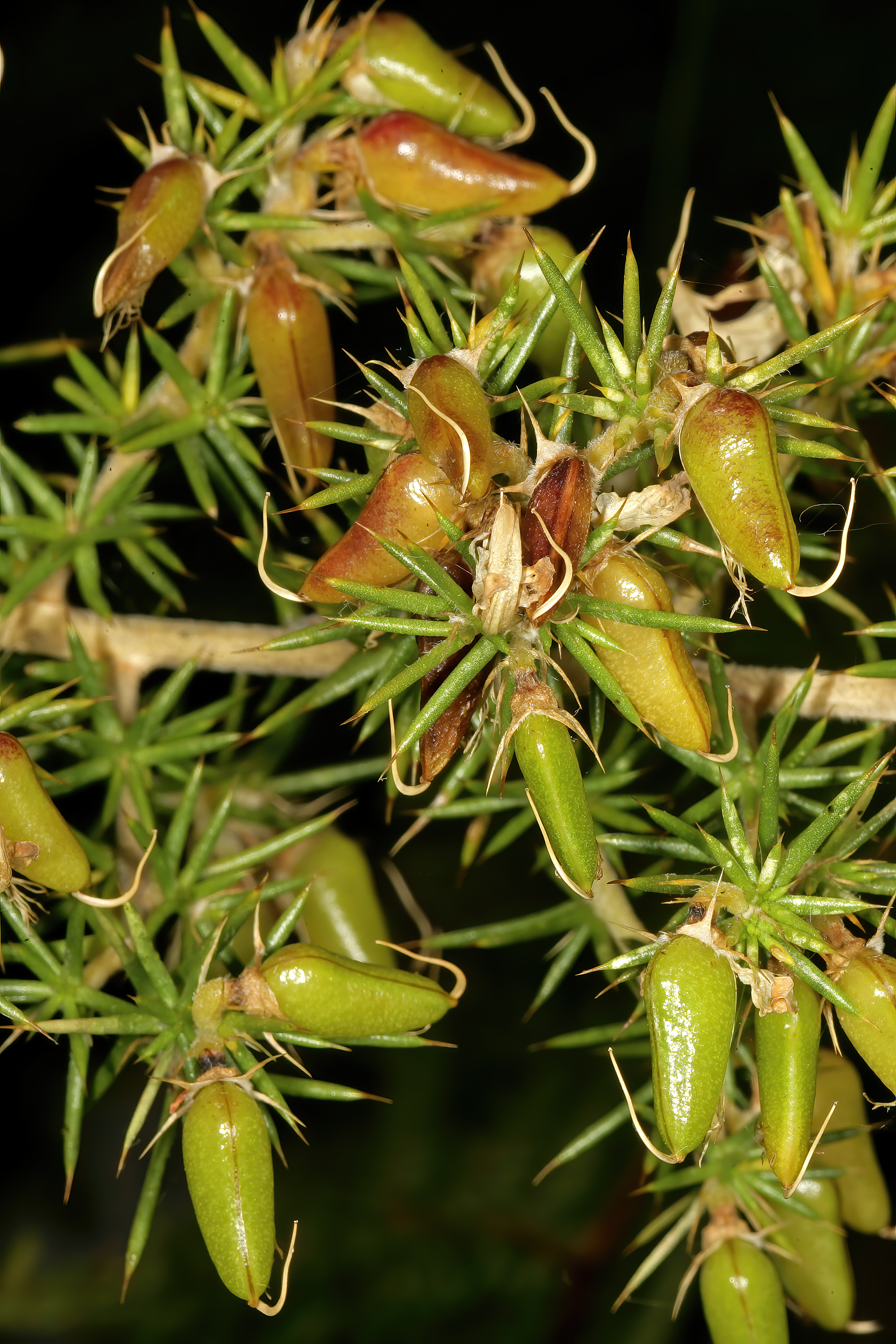

Scientific classification
- Kingdom: Plantae
- Clade: Tracheophytes
- Clade: Angiosperms
- Clade: Eudicots
- Clade: Rosids
- Order: Fabales
- Family: Fabaceae
- Subfamily: Faboideae
- Genus: Aspalathus
- Species: A. astroites

Binomial name
- Aspalathus astroites L.

Synonyms
- Achyronia astroites (L.) Kuntze; Aspalathus speciosa Steud.

= Aspalathus astroites =

Species of plant

Aspalathus astroites is a shrub belonging to the family Fabaceae. The species is endemic to the Western Cape and forms part of the fynbos. It occurs in the Cape Peninsula up to Du Toitskloof and southwards to the Kleinrivier Mountains, it has an area of occurrence of 3983 km² and the population is stable.
