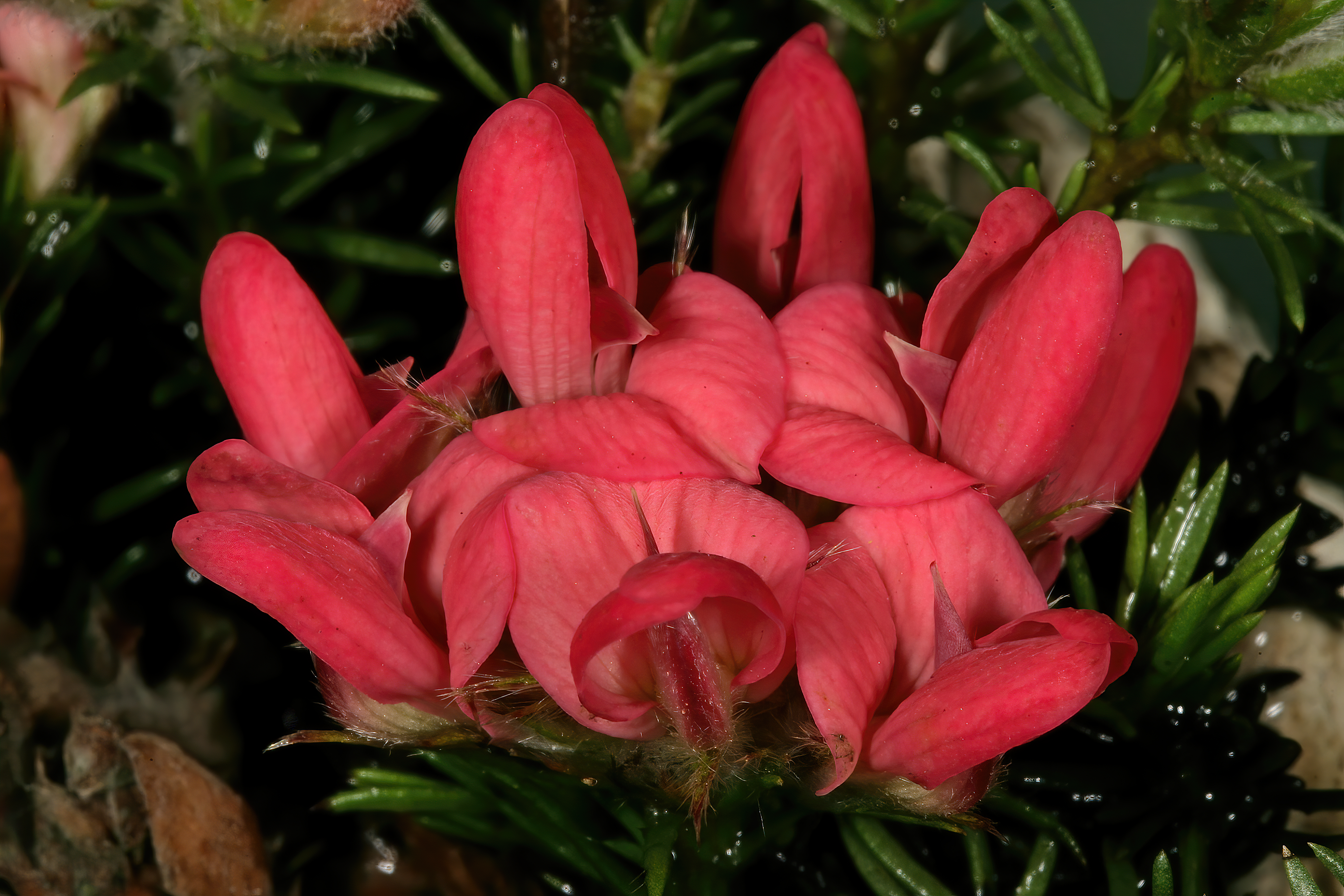

Scientific classification
- Kingdom: Plantae
- Clade: Tracheophytes
- Clade: Angiosperms
- Clade: Eudicots
- Clade: Rosids
- Order: Fabales
- Family: Fabaceae
- Subfamily: Faboideae
- Genus: Aspalathus
- Species: A. rosea

Binomial name
- Aspalathus rosea Garab. ex R.Dahlgren

= Aspalathus rosea =

Species of plant

Aspalathus rosea is a small to medium-sized shrub belonging to the family Fabaceae. The species is endemic to the Western Cape and forms part of the fynbos. It occurs from the Bot River to Elim and has a range of 1400 km^{2}. The plant has lost 50% of its habitat to vineyards and grain cultivation in the past 45 years. There are seven fragmented subpopulations remaining that are threatened by further agricultural activities, overgrazing and invasive species.
