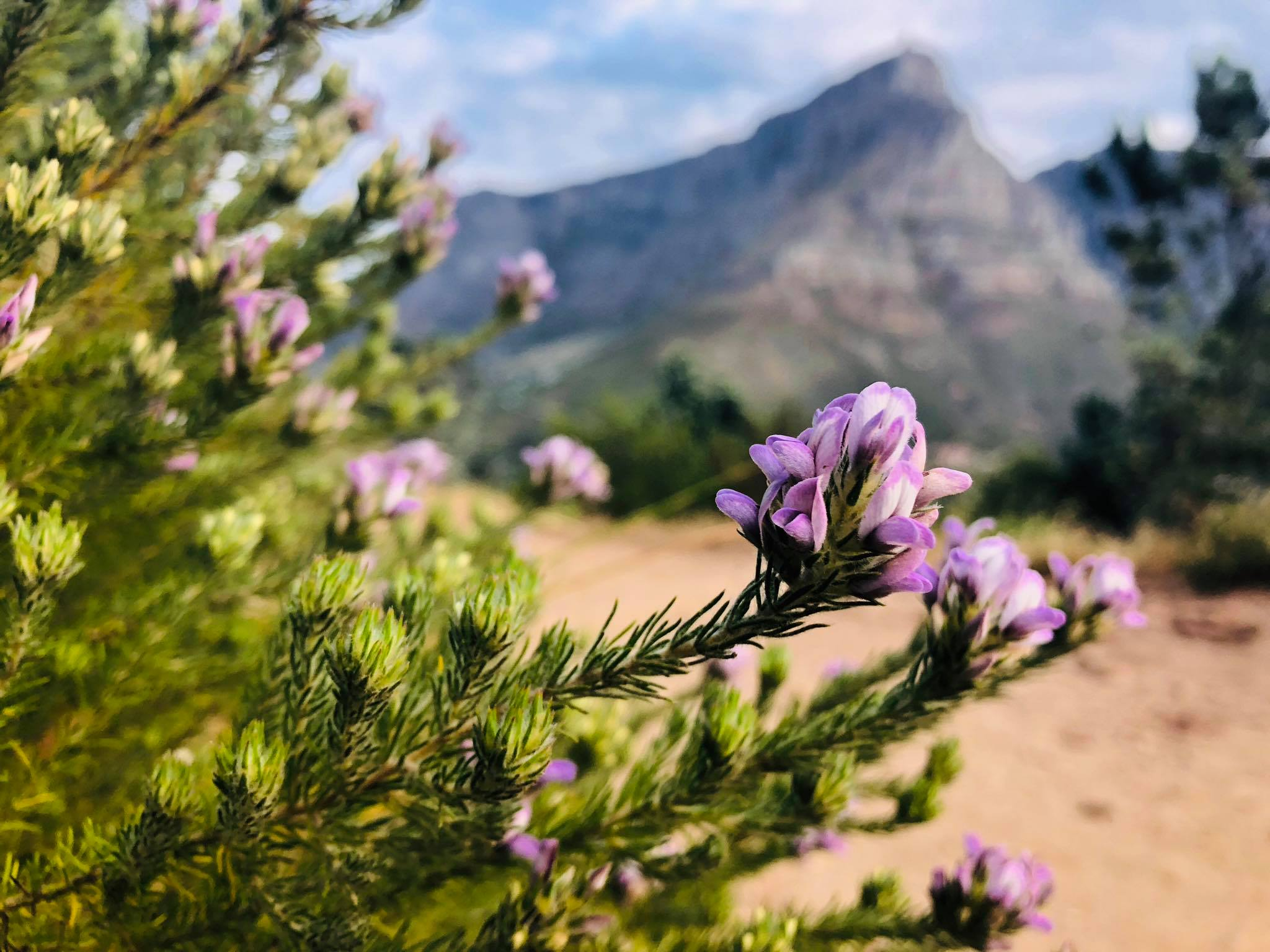

Scientific classification
- Kingdom: Plantae
- Clade: Tracheophytes
- Clade: Angiosperms
- Clade: Eudicots
- Clade: Rosids
- Order: Fabales
- Family: Fabaceae
- Subfamily: Faboideae
- Genus: Aspalathus
- Species: A. cephalotes

Binomial name
- Aspalathus cephalotes Thunb.

Synonyms
- Achyronia cephalotes (Thunb.) Kuntze; Paraspalathus cephalotes (Thunb.) C.Presl

= Aspalathus cephalotes =

Species of plant

Aspalathus cephalotes, the purplehead Capegorse, is a shrub belonging to the family Fabaceae. The species is endemic to the Western Cape and forms part of the fynbos.

The species has three subspecies:

- Aspalathus cephalotes subsp. cephalotes
- Aspalathus cephalotes subsp. obscurifolia R.Dahlgren
- Aspalathus cephalotes subsp. violacea R.Dahlgren
