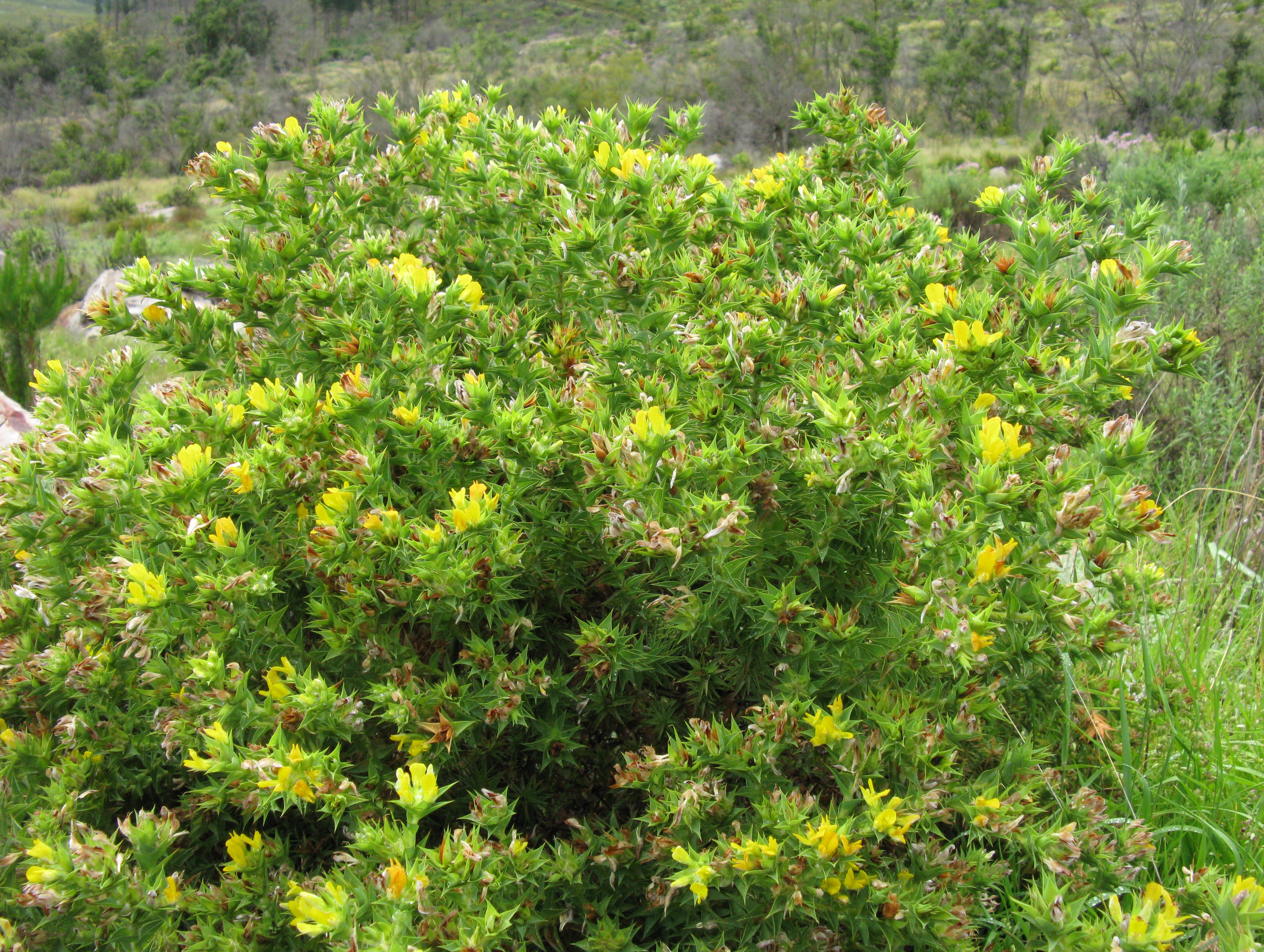

Scientific classification
- Kingdom: Plantae
- Clade: Tracheophytes
- Clade: Angiosperms
- Clade: Eudicots
- Clade: Rosids
- Order: Fabales
- Family: Fabaceae
- Subfamily: Faboideae
- Genus: Aspalathus
- Species: A. cordata

Binomial name
- Aspalathus cordata (L.) R.Dahlgren

Synonyms
- Borbonia cordata L.; Borbonia cordifolia Lam.

= Aspalathus cordata =

Species of plant

Aspalathus cordata is a shrub belonging to the family Fabaceae. The species is endemic to the Western Cape and forms part of the fynbos. It occurs from Piketberg to the Cape Peninsula and the mountains between Tulbagh and Hangklip.
