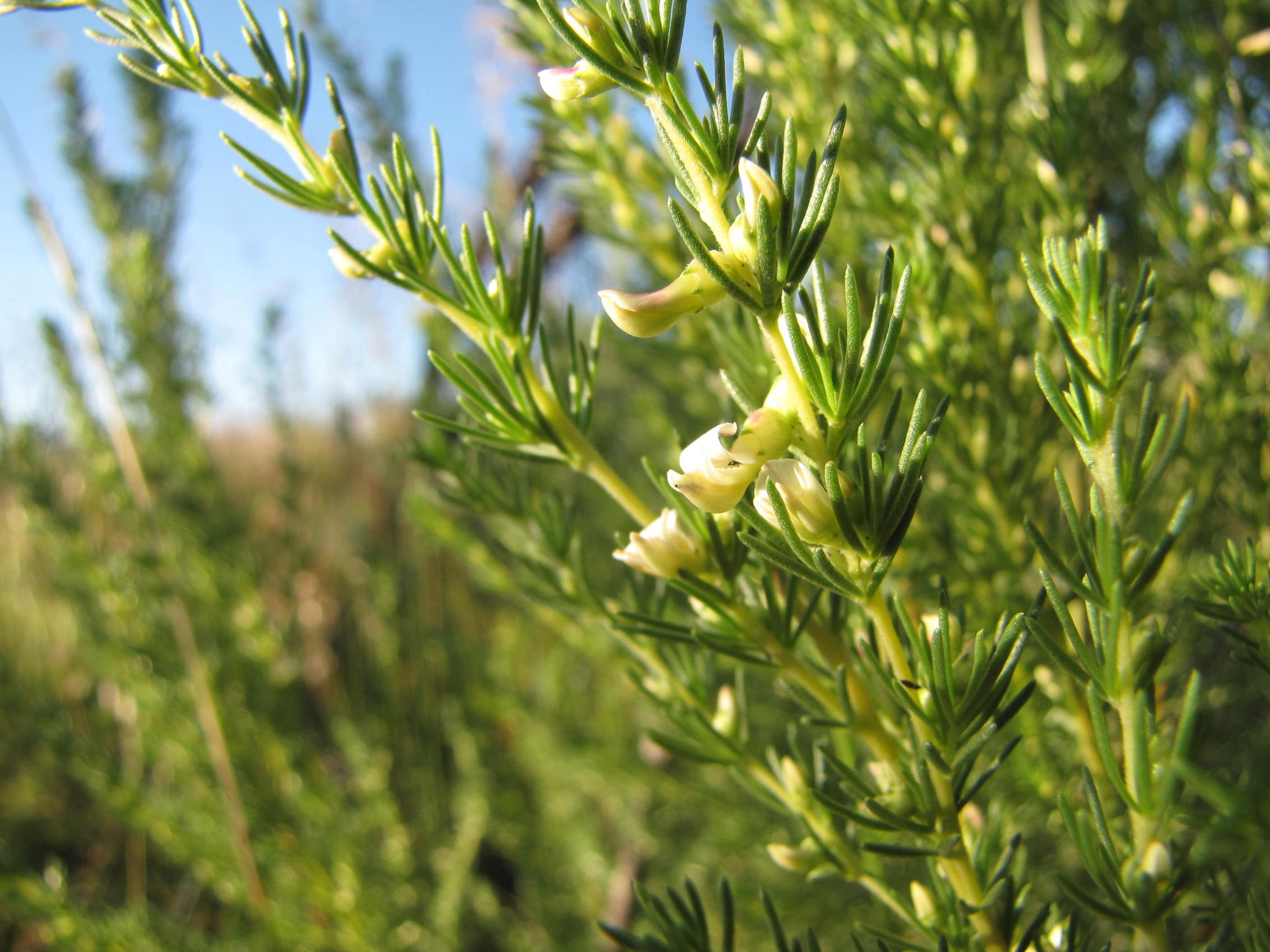

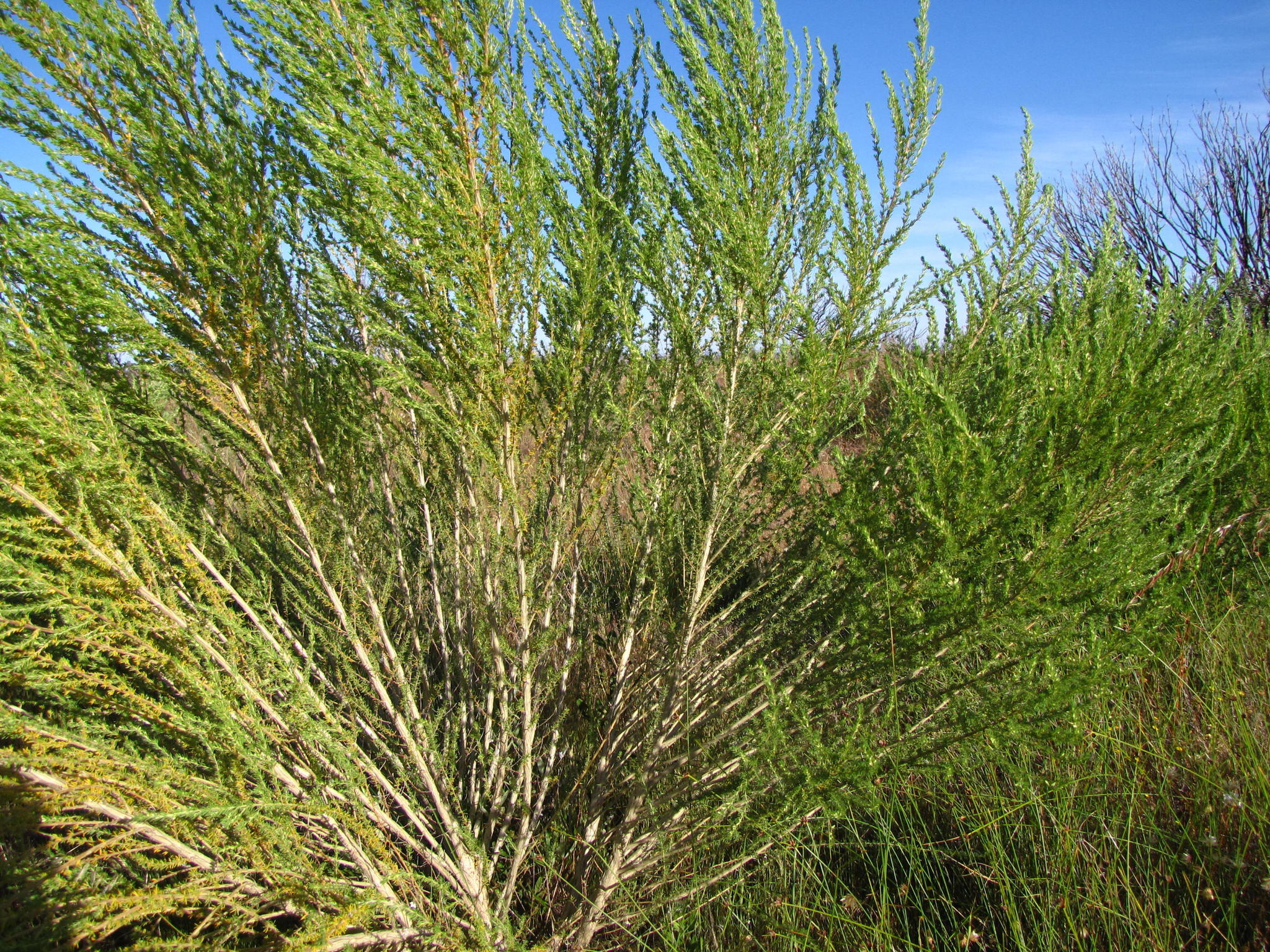

Conservation status
- Vulnerable (SANBI Red List)

Scientific classification
- Kingdom: Plantae
- Clade: Embryophytes
- Clade: Tracheophytes
- Clade: Angiosperms
- Clade: Eudicots
- Clade: Rosids
- Order: Fabales
- Family: Fabaceae
- Subfamily: Faboideae
- Genus: Aspalathus
- Species: A. obliqua

Binomial name
- Aspalathus obliqua R.Dahlgren, 1963

Synonyms
- Aspalathus lactea var. meyeri, W.H.Harvey & auct. suc. (1862)

= Aspalathus obliqua =

Species of plant endemic to South Africa

Aspalathus obliqua is a species of plant in the family Fabaceae endemic to the Kouebokkeveld Mountains in the Northern Cape, South Africa. It is threatened with extinction.

== Habitat and ecology ==
Aspalathus obliqua is found in Bokkeveld Sandstone fynbos habitat, on deep sandy flats.

== Conservation status ==
Aspalathus obliqua has been classified as Vulnerable due to its restricted range of less than 10 km^{2} (3.9 sq mi); it is known from only a single location. As an obligate seeder, the lack of regular fire due to rooibos tea farming and livestock grazing, is an added threat to its survival.
