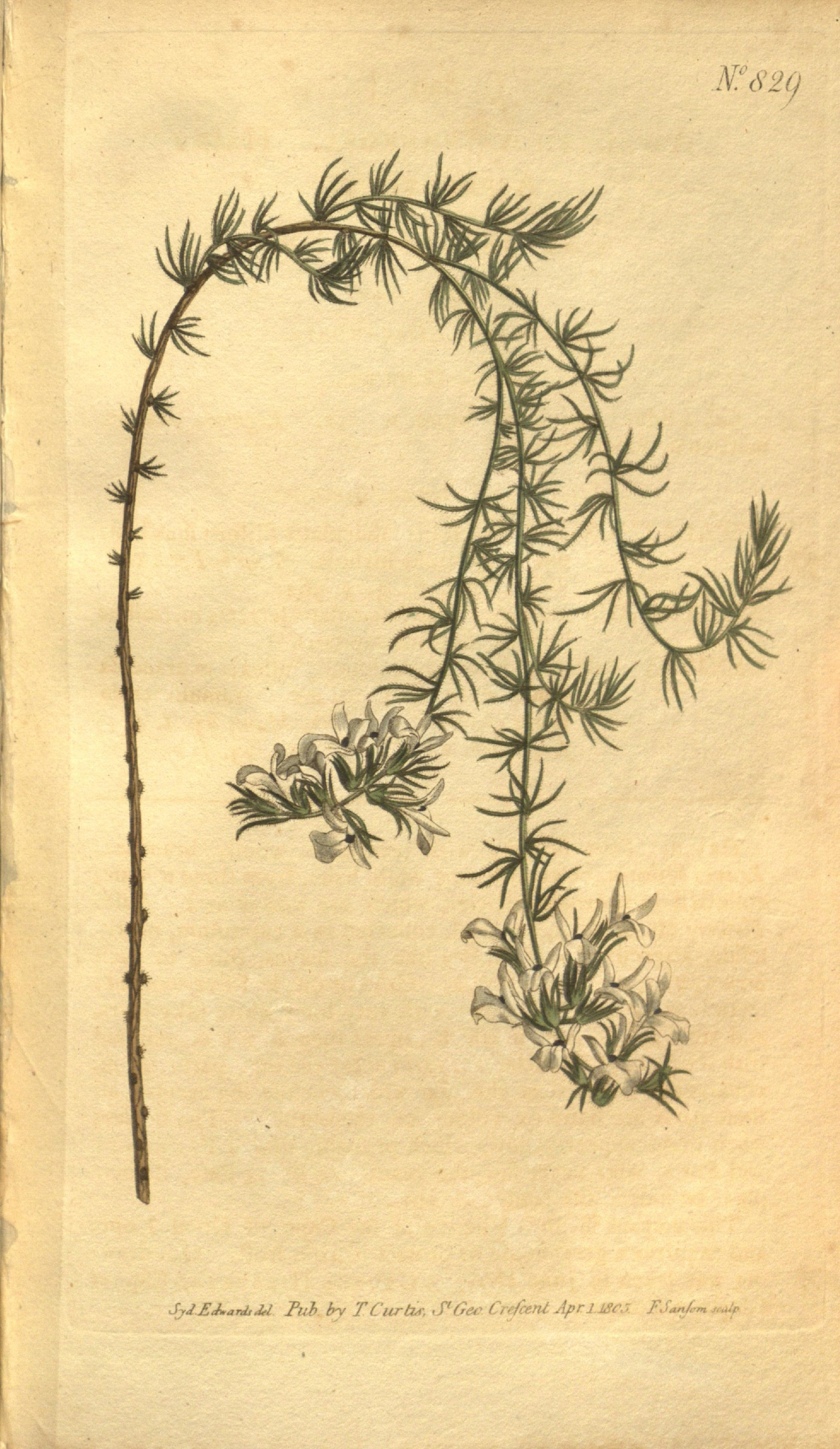

Scientific classification
- Kingdom: Plantae
- Clade: Tracheophytes
- Clade: Angiosperms
- Clade: Eudicots
- Clade: Rosids
- Order: Fabales
- Family: Fabaceae
- Subfamily: Faboideae
- Genus: Aspalathus
- Species: A. araneosa

Binomial name
- Aspalathus araneosa L.

Synonyms
- Achyronia araneosa (L.) Kuntze; Anthyllis quinqueflora L.f.; Aspalathus callosa Sims; Aspalathus pilosa Sieber ex Walp.; Aspalathus simsiana Eckl. & Zeyh.; Aspalathus simsiana var. montana Eckl. & Zeyh.; Paraspalathus araneosa (L.) C.Presl; Paraspalathus cancellata C.Presl; Paraspalathus simsiana (Eckl. & Zeyh.) C.Presl

= Aspalathus araneosa =

Species of plant

Aspalathus araneosa, commonly known as the spider Capegorse or molbossie, is a small to medium-sized shrub belonging to the family Fabaceae. The species is endemic to the Western Cape and forms part of the fynbos and renosterveld vegetation. It occurs in the Cape Peninsula as far as Malmesbury, has a range of 3700 km² and only ten of the original 35 subpopulations remain. The plant has lost habitat to the planting of citrus orchards, vineyards and cereals. The existing subpopulations are threatened by crop cultivation and invasive species.
