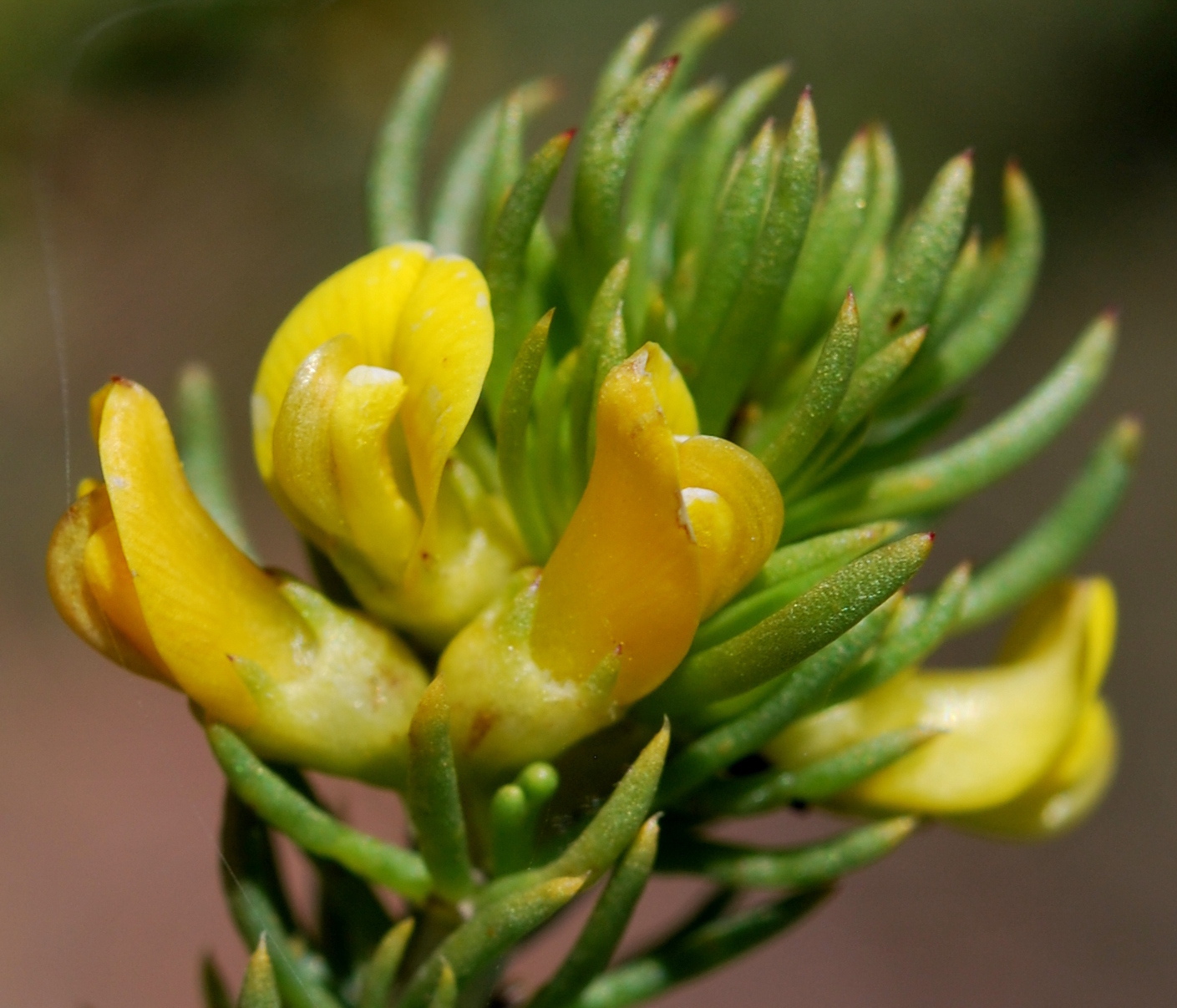

Scientific classification
- Kingdom: Plantae
- Clade: Tracheophytes
- Clade: Angiosperms
- Clade: Eudicots
- Clade: Rosids
- Order: Fabales
- Family: Fabaceae
- Subfamily: Faboideae
- Genus: Aspalathus
- Species: A. zeyheri

Binomial name
- Aspalathus zeyheri (Harv.) R.Dahlgren

Synonyms
- Aspalathus lactea var. zeyheri Harv.

= Aspalathus zeyheri =

Species of plant

Aspalathus zeyheri is a shrub belonging to the family Fabaceae. The species is endemic to the Western Cape and occurs from Swellendam and Potberg to Riversdale. The plant has a range of 5 200 km² and there are eleven fragmented subpopulations. It has already lost habitat to crop cultivation and is also threatened by invasive plants, uncontrolled wildfires and overgrazing.
