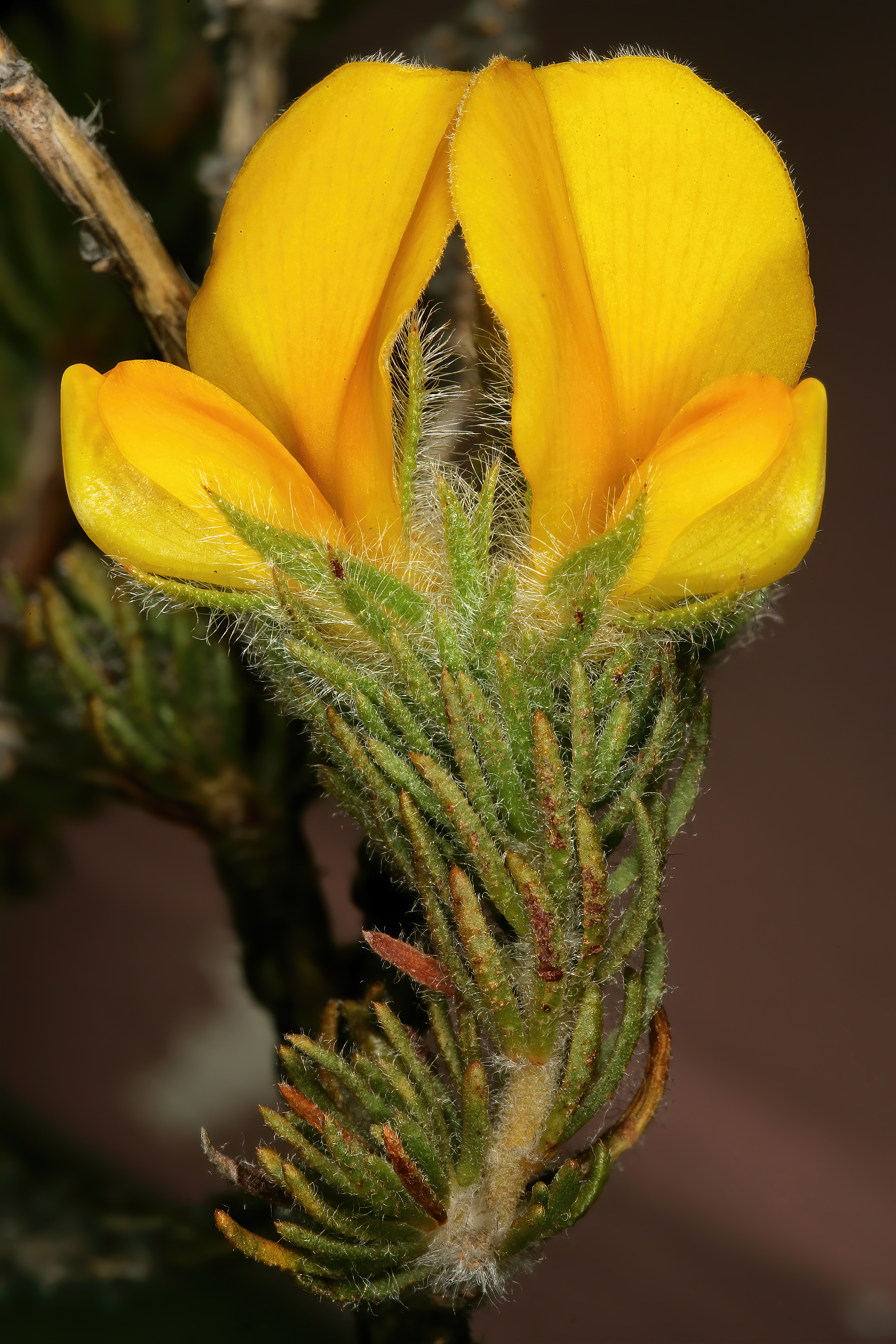

Scientific classification
- Kingdom: Plantae
- Clade: Tracheophytes
- Clade: Angiosperms
- Clade: Eudicots
- Clade: Rosids
- Order: Fabales
- Family: Fabaceae
- Subfamily: Faboideae
- Genus: Aspalathus
- Species: A. ciliaris

Binomial name
- Aspalathus ciliaris L.

Synonyms
- Achyronia ciliaris (L.) Kuntze; Achyronia leucophaea (Harv.) Kuntze; Aspalathus appendiculata E.Mey.; Aspalathus aulonogena Eckl. & Zeyh.; Aspalathus dubia E.Mey.; Aspalathus ecklonis Vogel ex Walp.; Aspalathus leucophaea Harv.; Aspalathus meyeriana Eckl. & Zeyh.; Aspalathus oresigena Eckl. & Zeyh.; Aspalathus papillosa Eckl. & Zeyh.; Aspalathus robusta Bolus ex Schltr.; Paraspalathus meyeriana (Eckl. & Zeyh.) C.Presl; Trineuria appendiculata (E.Mey.) C.Presl; Trineuria ciliaris (L.) C.Presl; Trineuria papillosa (Eckl. & Zeyh.) C.Presl

= Aspalathus ciliaris =

Species of plant

Aspalathus ciliaris, the fringe Capegorse, is a plant belonging to the genus Aspalathus. The species is endemic to the Eastern Cape and the Western Cape and forms part of the fynbos. It occurs from Clanwilliam to Humansdorp.
