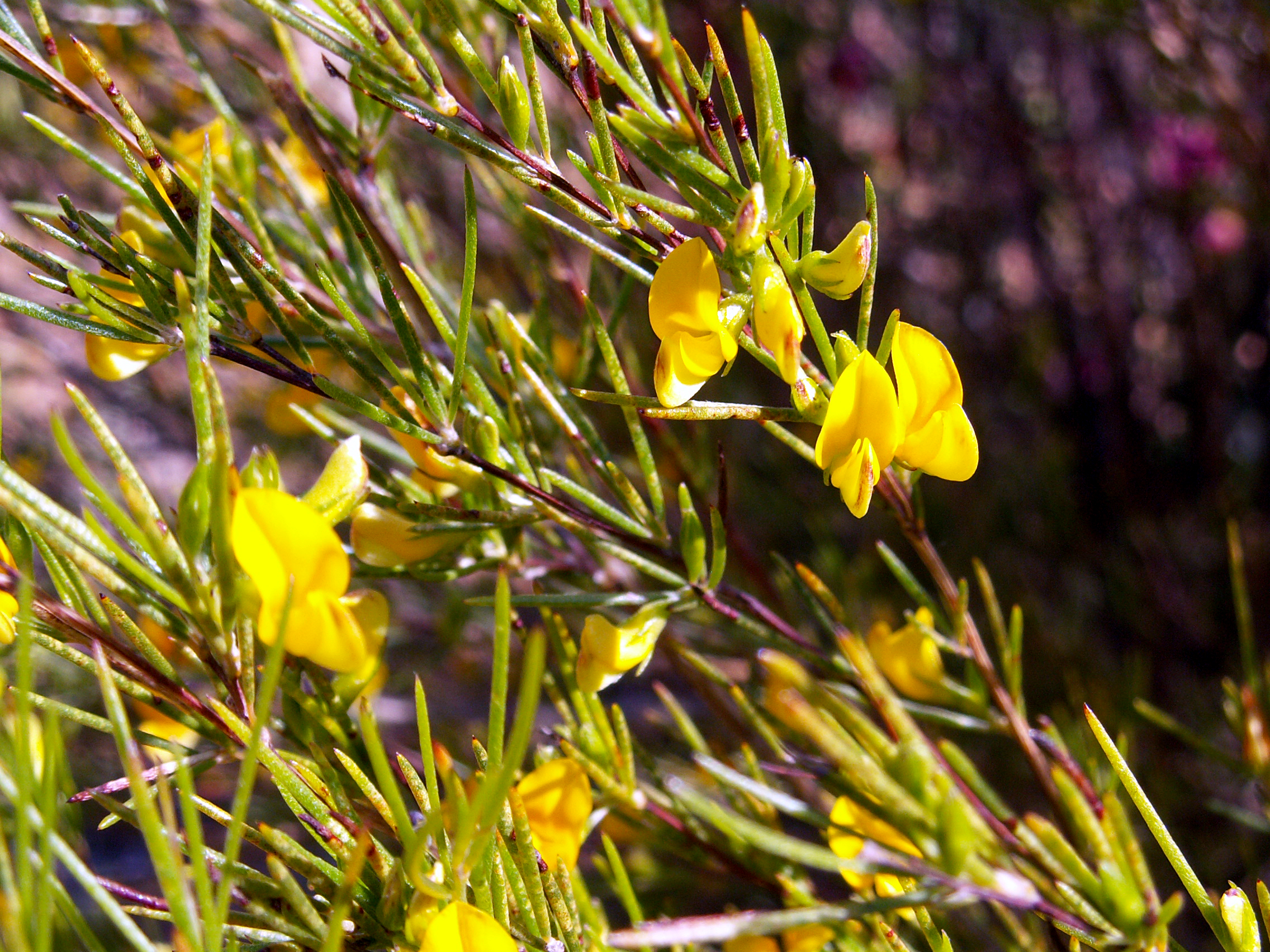
- Aspalathus linearis

Scientific classification
- Kingdom: Plantae
- Clade: Tracheophytes
- Clade: Angiosperms
- Clade: Eudicots
- Clade: Rosids
- Order: Fabales
- Family: Fabaceae
- Subfamily: Faboideae
- Tribe: Crotalarieae
- Genus: Aspalathus; L. (1753)

Species
- 291; see text

Synonyms
- Achironia Steudel; Achyronia L. (1758), nom. superfl.; Acropodium Desv. (1826); Bootia Adans. (1763), nom. superfl.; Borbonia L. (1753); Cyphocalyx C.Presl (1845); Diallosperma Raf. (1838); Eriocyclax Neck. (1790), opus utique oppr.; Heterolathus C.Presl (1845); Pachyraphea C.Presl (1845); Paraspalathus C.Presl (1845); Plagiostigma C.Presl (1845); Psilolepus C.Presl (1845); Sarcophyllum Willd. (1802), orth. var.; Sarcophyllus Thunb. (1799); Streptosema C.Presl (1845); Trineuria C.Presl (1845)

= Aspalathus =

Genus of legumes

Aspalathus is a genus of flowering plants in the family Fabaceae. The yellow flowers and spiny habit of some species have suggested a resemblance to Ulex europaeus, the thorny "English gorse" Accordingly, "Cape Gorse" has been proposed as a common name although the resemblance is largely superficial; for instance, gorse is thorny, whereas Aspalathus species are variously spiny or unarmed. The genus belongs to the subfamily Faboideae. There are over 270 species, mainly endemic to southwestern fynbos regions in South Africa, with over fifty occurring on the Cape Peninsula alone. The species Aspalathus linearis is commercially important, being farmed as the source of Rooibos tea.

Aspalathus species generally are shrubs or sometimes shrublets. They are normally bushy, however some species can grow sprawling or upright with branches that stand on their own. The flowers of most species are plentiful in season, a rich, showy yellow very common in the Western Cape mountains in particular. The flowers of some yellow-flowering species (such as Aspalathus cordata) turn bright red as they fade. Some species, such as Aspalathus forbesii have white or cream flowers, and others, such as Aspalathus costulata and Aspalathus cordata have flowers in various shades ranging from pink to pale violet, whereas Aspalathus nigra commonly has slate-blue flowers.

Aspalathus leaves are sessile and are simple in some species, but trifoliate in others. They commonly are fascicled. In some species they bear hard, sharp, spines at their tips. There are no stipules.

Aspalathus species may be grouped into four categories for purposes of rough identification in the field. One group has undivided leaves, never tufted. This includes Rooibos, Aspalathus linearis with its needle-like leaves, and Aspalathus cordata with its stiff, neatly cordate leaves with their aggressively spiny tips, are typical examples. Another group has leaflets sharp, stiff, and acicular. Examples include Aspalathus astroites and Aspalathus chenopoda.

A third group has cylindrical, fleshy leaves, not spiny, for example Aspalathus capitata and Aspalathus pinguis, while members of the fourth group, such as Aspalathus aspalathoides and Aspalathus securifolia have more or less flat leaflets.

The fruit of Aspalathus is a pod, and in the majority of species the ovary has two ovules that yield only one seed per pod. However, some pods are several-seeded.

Various species of Aspalathus have been used in traditional medicines and as "bush teas", including Aspalathus tenuifolia, but it is difficult to know which sources to trust, because many specific names have been changed or confused in the past. Also, many uses were very local, and there was a good deal of confusion between different species, even sometimes with similar genera, such as Cyclopia, some species of which yield honeybush tea.

== Species ==
Aspalathus comprises the following species:

- Aspalathus abietina Thunb.
- Aspalathus acanthes Eckl. & Zeyh.
- Aspalathus acanthiloba R. Dahlgren
- Aspalathus acanthoclada R. Dahlgren
- Aspalathus acanthophylla Eckl. & Zeyh.
- Aspalathus acicularis E. Mey.
  - subsp. acicularis E. Mey.
  - subsp. planifolia R. Dahlgren
- Aspalathus acidota R. Dahlgren
- Aspalathus acifera R. Dahlgren
- Aspalathus aciloba R. Dahlgren
- Aspalathus aciphylla Harv.
- Aspalathus aculeata Thunb.
- Aspalathus acuminata Lam.
  - subsp. acuminata Lam.
  - subsp. pungens (Thunb.) R. Dahlgren
- Aspalathus acutiflora R. Dahlgren
- Aspalathus albens L.
- Aspalathus alopecurus Benth.
- Aspalathus alpestris (Benth.) R. Dahlgren
- Aspalathus altissima R. Dahlgren
- Aspalathus angustifolia (Lam.) R. Dahlgren
  - subsp. angustifolia (Lam.) R. Dahlgren
  - subsp. robusta (E. Phillips) R. Dahlgren
- Aspalathus araneosa L.
- Aspalathus arenaria R. Dahlgren
- Aspalathus argentea L.
- Aspalathus argyrella MacOwan
- Aspalathus argyrophanes R. Dahlgren
- Aspalathus arida E. Mey.
- Aspalathus aristata Compton
- Aspalathus aristifolia R. Dahlgren
- Aspalathus aspalathoides (L.) R. Dahlgren
- Aspalathus asparagoides L. f.
  - subsp. asparagoides L. f.
  - subsp. rubrofusca (Eckl. & Zeyh.) R. Dahlgren
- Aspalathus astroites L.
- Aspalathus attenuata R. Dahlgren
- Aspalathus aurantiaca R. Dahlgren
- Aspalathus barbata (Lam.) R. Dahlgren
- Aspalathus barbigera R. Dahlgren
- Aspalathus batodes Eckl. & Zeyh.
- Aspalathus bidouwensis R. Dahlgren
- Aspalathus biflora E. Mey.
- Aspalathus bodkinii Bolus
- Aspalathus borbonifolia R. Dahlgren
- Aspalathus bowieana (Benth.) R. Dahlgren
- Aspalathus bracteata Thunb.
- Aspalathus burchelliana Benth.
- Aspalathus caespitosa R. Dahlgren
- Aspalathus calcarata Harv.
- Aspalathus calcarea R. Dahlgren
- Aspalathus callosa L.
- Aspalathus campestris R. Dahlgren
- Aspalathus candicans W.T. Aiton
- Aspalathus candidula R. Dahlgren
- Aspalathus capensis (Walp.) R. Dahlgren
- Aspalathus capitata L.
- Aspalathus carnosa Bergius
- Aspalathus cephalotes Thunb.
  - subsp. cephalotes Thunb.
  - subsp. obscuriflora R. Dahlgren
  - subsp. violacea R. Dahlgren
- Aspalathus cerrantha Eckl. & Zeyh.
- Aspalathus chenopoda L.
- Aspalathus chortophila Eckl. & Zeyh.
- Aspalathus chrysantha R. Dahlgren
- Aspalathus ciliaris L.
- Aspalathus cinerascens E. Mey.
- Aspalathus citrina R. Dahlgren
- Aspalathus cliffortiifolia R. Dahlgren
- Aspalathus cliffortioides Bolus
- Aspalathus collina Eckl. & Zeyh.
- Aspalathus commutata (Vogel) R. Dahlgren
- Aspalathus compacta R. Dahlgren
- Aspalathus complicata (Benth.) R. Dahlgren
- Aspalathus comptonii R. Dahlgren
- Aspalathus concava Bolus
- Aspalathus concavifolia (Eckl. & Zeyh.) R. Dahlgren
- Aspalathus condensata R. Dahlgren
- Aspalathus confusa R. Dahlgren
- Aspalathus cordata (L.) R. Dahlgren
- Aspalathus cordicarpa (L.) R. Dahlgren
- Aspalathus corniculata R. Dahlgren
- Aspalathus corrudifolia Bergius
- Aspalathus costulata Benth.
- Aspalathus crassisepala R. Dahlgren
- Aspalathus crenata (L.) R. Dahlgren
- Aspalathus cuspidata R. Dahlgren
- Aspalathus cymbiformis DC.
- Aspalathus cytisoides Lam.
- Aspalathus dasyantha Eckl. & Zeyh.
- Aspalathus decora R. Dahlgren
- Aspalathus densifolia Benth.
- Aspalathus desertorum Bolus
- Aspalathus dianthophora E. Phillips
- Aspalathus diffusa Eckl. & Zeyh.
- Aspalathus digitifolia R. Dahlgren
- Aspalathus divaricata Thunb.
  - subsp. divaricata Thunb.
  - subsp. gracilior R. Dahlgren
- Aspalathus dunsdoniana R. Dahlgren
- Aspalathus elliptica (E. Phillips) R. Dahlgren
- Aspalathus ericifolia L.
  - subsp. ericifolia L.
  - subsp. minuta R. Dahlgren
  - subsp. pusilla R. Dahlgren
- Aspalathus erythrodes Eckl. & Zeyh.
- Aspalathus esterhuyseniae R. Dahlgren
- Aspalathus excelsa R. Dahlgren
- Aspalathus fasciculata (Thunb.) R. Dahlgren
- Aspalathus ferox Harv.
- Aspalathus filicaulis Eckl. & Zeyh.
- Aspalathus flexuosa Thunb.
- Aspalathus florifera R. Dahlgren
- Aspalathus florulenta R. Dahlgren
- Aspalathus forbesii Harv.
- Aspalathus fourcadei L. Bolus
- Aspalathus frankenioides DC.
- Aspalathus fusca Thunb.
- Aspalathus galeata E. Mey.
- Aspalathus gerrardii Bolus
- Aspalathus glabrata R. Dahlgren
- Aspalathus glabrescens R. Dahlgren
- Aspalathus globosa Andrews
- Aspalathus globulosa E. Mey.
- Aspalathus glossoides R. Dahlgren
- Aspalathus grandiflora Benth.
- Aspalathus granulata R. Dahlgren
- Aspalathus grobleri R. Dahlgren
- Aspalathus heterophylla L. f.
- Aspalathus hirta E. Mey.
  - subsp. hirta E. Mey.
  - subsp. stellaris R. Dahlgren
- Aspalathus hispida Thunb.
  - subsp. albiflora (Eckl. & Zeyh.) R. Dahlgren
  - subsp. hispida Thunb.
- Aspalathus humilis Bolus
- Aspalathus hypnoides R. Dahlgren
- Aspalathus hystrix L. f.
- Aspalathus incana R. Dahlgren
- Aspalathus incompta Thunb.
- Aspalathus incurva Thunb.
- Aspalathus incurvifolia Walp.
- Aspalathus inops Eckl. & Zeyh.
- Aspalathus intermedia Eckl. & Zeyh.
- Aspalathus intervallaris Bolus
- Aspalathus intricata Compton
- Aspalathus joubertiana Eckl. & Zeyh.
- Aspalathus juniperina Thunb.
- Aspalathus karrooensis R. Dahlgren
- Aspalathus kougaensis (Garab. ex R. Dahlgren) R. Dahlgren
- Aspalathus lactea Thunb.
  - subsp. breviloba R. Dahlgren
  - subsp. lactea Thunb.
- Aspalathus laeta Bolus
- Aspalathus lamarckiana R. Dahlgren
- Aspalathus lanata E. Mey.
- Aspalathus lanceicarpa R. Dahlgren
- Aspalathus lanceifolia R. Dahlgren
- Aspalathus lanifera R. Dahlgren
- Aspalathus laricifolia Bergius
  - subsp. canescens (L.) R. Dahlgren
  - subsp. laricifolia Bergius
- Aspalathus latifolia Bolus
- Aspalathus leiantha (E. Phillips) R. Dahlgren
- Aspalathus lenticula Bolus
- Aspalathus leptoptera Bolus
- Aspalathus leucophylla R. Dahlgren
- Aspalathus linearis (Burm. f.) R. Dahlgren
- Aspalathus linguiloba R. Dahlgren
- Aspalathus longifolia Benth.
- Aspalathus longipes Harv.
- Aspalathus lotiflora R. Dahlgren
- Aspalathus macrantha Harv.
- Aspalathus macrocarpa Eckl. & Zeyh.
- Aspalathus marginalis Eckl. & Zeyh.
- Aspalathus marginata Harv.
- Aspalathus microphylla DC.
- Aspalathus millefolia R. Dahlgren
- Aspalathus monosperma (DC.) R. Dahlgren
- Aspalathus mundiana Eckl. & Zeyh.
- Aspalathus muraltioides Eckl. & Zeyh.
- Aspalathus myrtillifolia Benth.
- Aspalathus neglecta T. M. Salter
- Aspalathus nigra L.
- Aspalathus nivea Thunb.
- Aspalathus nudiflora Harv.
- Aspalathus obliqua R. Dahlgren
- Aspalathus oblongifolia R. Dahlgren
- Aspalathus obtusifolia R. Dahlgren
- Aspalathus odontoloba R. Dahlgren
- Aspalathus oliveri R. Dahlgren
- Aspalathus opaca Eckl. & Zeyh.
  - subsp. opaca Eckl. & Zeyh.
  - subsp. pappeana (Harv.) R. Dahlgren
  - subsp. rostriloba R. Dahlgren
- Aspalathus orbiculata Benth.
- Aspalathus pachyloba Benth.
  - subsp. macroclada R. Dahlgren
  - subsp. pachyloba Benth.
  - subsp. rugulicarpa R. Dahlgren
  - subsp. villicaulis R. Dahlgren
- Aspalathus pallescens Eckl. & Zeyh.
- Aspalathus pallidiflora R. Dahlgren
- Aspalathus parviflora Bergius
- Aspalathus patens R. Dahlgren
- Aspalathus pedicellata Harv.
- Aspalathus pedunculata Houtt.
- Aspalathus pendula R. Dahlgren
- Aspalathus perfoliata (Lam.) R. Dahlgren
- Aspalathus perforata (Thunb.) R. Dahlgren
- Aspalathus pigmentosa R. Dahlgren
- Aspalathus pilantha R. Dahlgren
- Aspalathus pinea Thunb.
- Aspalathus pinguis Thunb.
- Aspalathus polycephala E. Mey.
- Aspalathus potbergensis R. Dahlgren
- Aspalathus proboscidea R. Dahlgren
- Aspalathus prostrata Eckl. & Zeyh.
- Aspalathus psoraleoides (C. Presl) Benth.
- Aspalathus pulicifolia R. Dahlgren
- Aspalathus pumila R. Dahlgren
- Aspalathus pycnantha R. Dahlgren
- Aspalathus quadrata L. Bolus
- Aspalathus quinquefolia L.
  - subsp. compacta R. Dahlgren
  - subsp. quinquefolia L.
  - subsp. virgata (Thunb.) R. Dahlgren
- Aspalathus radiata R. Dahlgren
- Aspalathus ramosissima R. Dahlgren
- Aspalathus ramulosa E. Mey.
- Aspalathus rectistyla R. Dahlgren
- Aspalathus recurva Benth.
- Aspalathus recurvispina R. Dahlgren
- Aspalathus repens R. Dahlgren
- Aspalathus retroflexa L.
  - subsp. bicolor (Eckl. & Zeyh.) R. Dahlgren
  - subsp. retroflexa L.
- Aspalathus rigidifolia R. Dahlgren
- Aspalathus rosea R. Dahlgren
- Aspalathus rostrata Benth.
- Aspalathus rostripetala R. Dahlgren
- Aspalathus rubens Thunb.
- Aspalathus rubiginosa R. Dahlgren
- Aspalathus rugosa Thunb.
- Aspalathus rupestris R. Dahlgren
- Aspalathus rycroftii R. Dahlgren
- Aspalathus salicifolia R. Dahlgren
- Aspalathus salteri L. Bolus
- Aspalathus sanguinea Thunb.
- Aspalathus sceptrum-aureum R. Dahlgren
- Aspalathus secunda E. Mey.
- Aspalathus securifolia Eckl. & Zeyh.
- Aspalathus sericea Bergius
- Aspalathus serpens R. Dahlgren
- Aspalathus setacea Eckl. & Zeyh.
- Aspalathus simii Bolus
- Aspalathus smithii R. Dahlgren
- Aspalathus spectabilis R. Dahlgren
- Aspalathus spicata Thunb.
- Aspalathus spiculata R. Dahlgren
- Aspalathus spinescens Thunb.
  - subsp. lepida (E. Mey.) R. Dahlgren
  - subsp. spinescens Thunb.
- Aspalathus spinosa L.
  - subsp. flavispina (C. Presl ex Benth.) R. Dahlgren
  - subsp. glauca (Eckl. & Zeyh.) R. Dahlgren
  - subsp. spinosa L.
- Aspalathus spinosissima R. Dahlgren
- Aspalathus stenophylla Eckl. & Zeyh.
- Aspalathus steudeliana Brongn.
- Aspalathus stokoei L. Bolus
- Aspalathus suaveolens Eckl. & Zeyh.
- Aspalathus submissa R. Dahlgren
- Aspalathus subtingens Eckl. & Zeyh.
- Aspalathus subulata Thunb.
- Aspalathus sulphurea R. Dahlgren
- Aspalathus taylorii R. Dahlgren
- Aspalathus tenuissima R. Dahlgren
- Aspalathus teres Eckl. & Zeyh.
  - subsp. teres Eckl. & Zeyh.
  - subsp. thodei R. Dahlgren
- Aspalathus ternata (Thunb.) Druce
- Aspalathus tridentata L.
- Aspalathus triquetra Thunb.
- Aspalathus truncata Eckl. & Zeyh.
- Aspalathus tuberculata Walp.
- Aspalathus tylodes Eckl. & Zeyh.
- Aspalathus ulicina Eckl. & Zeyh.
  - subsp. kardouwensis R. Dahlgren
  - subsp. ulicina Eckl. & Zeyh.
- Aspalathus uniflora L.
- Aspalathus vacciniifolia R. Dahlgren
- Aspalathus varians Eckl. & Zeyh.
- Aspalathus variegata Eckl. & Zeyh.
- Aspalathus venosa E. Mey.
- Aspalathus verbasciformis R. Dahlgren
- Aspalathus vermiculata Lam.
- Aspalathus villosa Thunb.
- Aspalathus vulnerans Thunb.
- Aspalathus vulpina R. Dahlgren
- Aspalathus wittebergensis Compton & P.E. Barnes
- Aspalathus wurmbeana E. Mey.
- Aspalathus zeyheri (Harv.) R. Dahlgren
