= Sand pea =

Sand pea is a common name for several plants and may refer to:

- Eriosema
- Lathyrus japonicus

== See also ==
- beach pea
- Dissodactylus mellitae, the sand-dollar pea crab
