= Beach pea =

Beach pea is a common name for several plants and may refer to:

- Vigna marina, known as nanea and notched cowpea, a species of legume in the family Fabaceae
- Lathyrus japonicus, common names Sea Pea, Circumpolar Pea, and Sea Vetchling, a legume native to temperate coastal areas of Asia, Europe, and North and South America
- Lathyrus littoralis, a species of wild pea known by the common name silky beach pea.
- Galactia, a genus of flowering plants in the family Fabaceae

== See also ==
- Beach bean
- Sand pea
