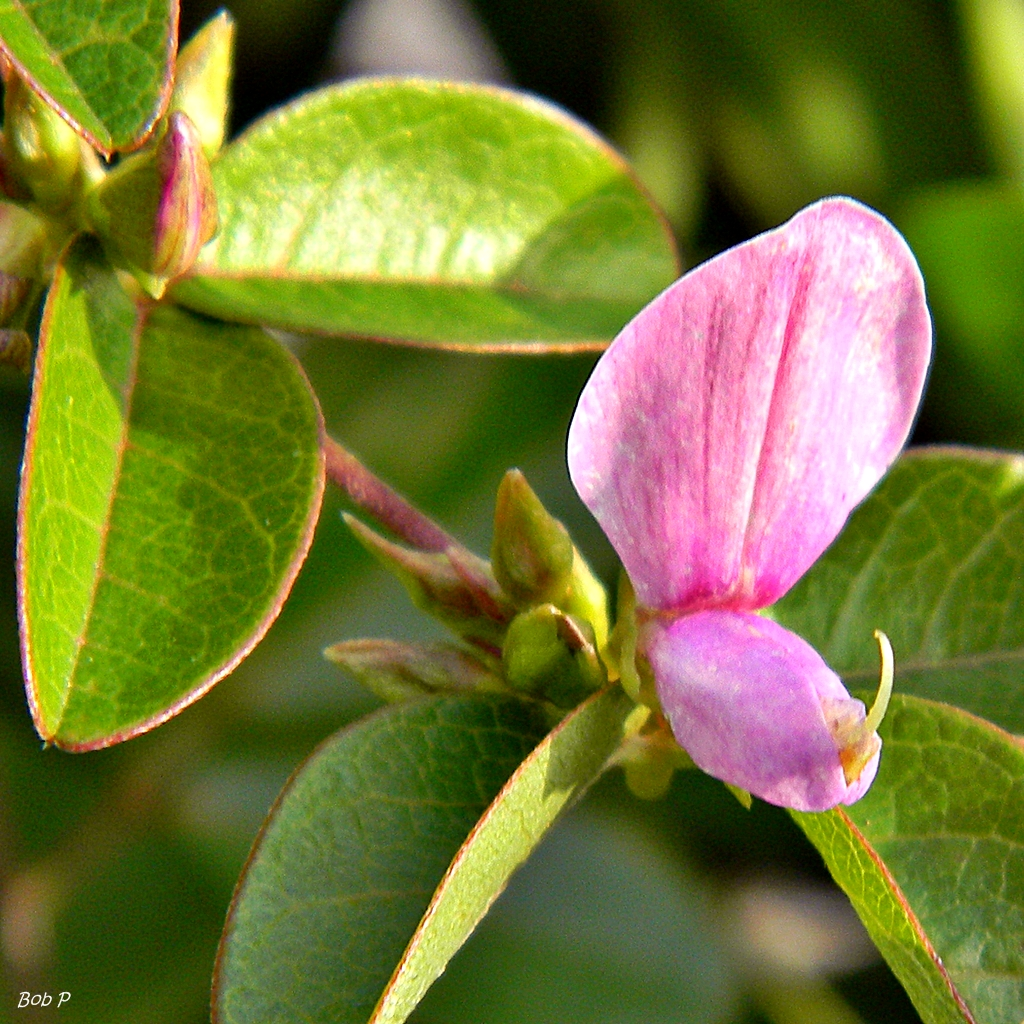

Conservation status
- Secure (NatureServe)

Scientific classification
- Kingdom: Plantae
- Clade: Embryophytes
- Clade: Tracheophytes
- Clade: Angiosperms
- Clade: Eudicots
- Clade: Rosids
- Order: Fabales
- Family: Fabaceae
- Subfamily: Faboideae
- Genus: Galactia
- Species: G. regularis

Binomial name
- Galactia regularis (L.) Britton, Sterns & Poggenburg

Synonyms
- Dolichos regularis L.; Clitoria lactescens L.; Galactia angustifolia var. retusa C.Wright ex Griseb.

= Galactia regularis =

Species of plant

Galactia regularis, the downy milk pea or eastern milkpea, is a perennial species of herb or vine in the bean family. It is native to the entire southeastern United States, from Texas east to Florida, north to New Jersey and west through Kansas. Its historical range included New York state, but is presumed extirpated by NatureServe. Some record exists of a range extending to Cuba, but this is not supported by current observations.

== Description ==
It is an erect or climbing bine with hirsute to villous stems with deflexed hairs which is most often found in dry forests widespread across the eastern US. Its leaves are palmately compound, composed of three elliptic leaflets approximately 5 to 25 mm wide, are widest at the midpoint and thick in texture and do not have glaucus undersides. In its native range it can easily be confused with related genera such as Desmodium or Strophostyles. Its chasmogamous flowers are arranged in sets of 1 to 16 per peduncle (10 to 280 mm in length), and can occur in white, pink, red, or purple. Across its range it blooms from July through September and fruits from August to October.

== Ecology ==
The plant is eaten by bobwhite quail and is a host of the Io moth. Its flowers are visited by Megachile brimleyi, white-footed leaf-cutter bee, golden sweat bee and common little leaf-cutter bee. As a legume it retains a symbiotic relationship with the nitrogen-fixing bacteria Rhizobia. Its status as a relatively uncommon or potentially threatened species within some states, despite overall security, may in part be a result of the proliferation of introduced species such as Galactia officinalis. G. regularis has been described as "gap-dependent" where the plant is adapted to benefit from fires in forests or shrublands, taking advantage of the new gaps in canopy cover.

Galactia regularis is insect pollinated and is recorded to have been visited in northern Florida by Megachile albitarsis and Anthidiellum notatum.
