= Galactia brachypoda =

Scientific classification
- Kingdom: Plantae
- Clade: Tracheophytes
- Clade: Angiosperms
- Clade: Eudicots
- Clade: Rosids
- Order: Fabales
- Family: Fabaceae
- Subfamily: Faboideae
- Genus: Galactia
- Species: G. brachypoda

Binomial name
- Galactia brachypoda Torr. & A.Gray

Species of plant

Galactia brachypoda, is a flowering plant. It is native to areas including in Florida.
