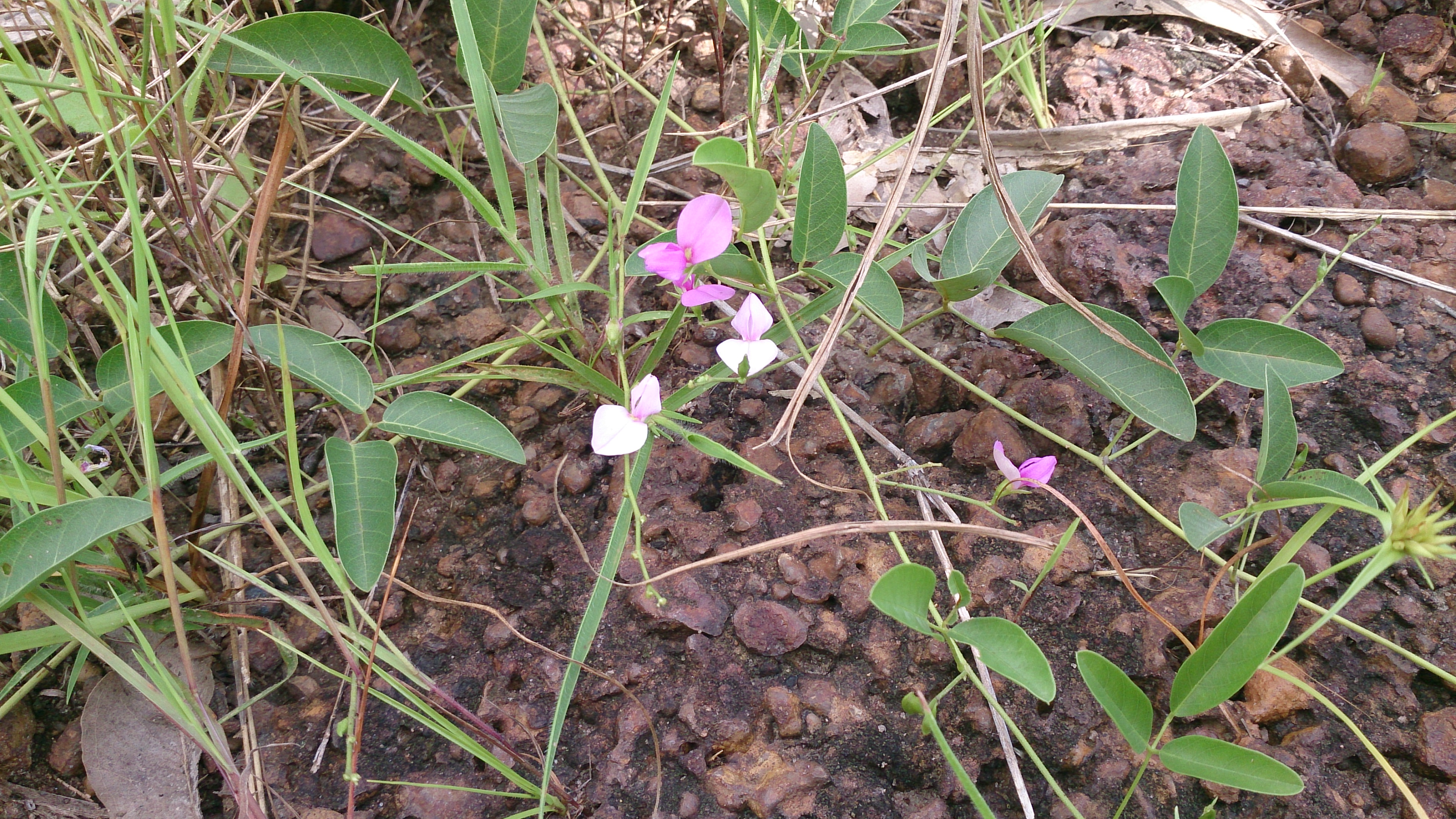
- Galactia tenuiflora flowers. Darwin Region, Australia

Scientific classification
- Kingdom: Plantae
- Clade: Tracheophytes
- Clade: Angiosperms
- Clade: Eudicots
- Clade: Rosids
- Order: Fabales
- Family: Fabaceae
- Subfamily: Faboideae
- Genus: Galactia
- Species: G. tenuiflora

Binomial name
- Galactia tenuiflora (Willd.) Wight & Arn.

= Galactia tenuiflora =

Species of legume

Galactia tenuiflora is a twining or trailing vine belonging to the family Fabaceae. This pantropical species is found in northern Australia between the Kimberley region and North Queensland. It is found in a variety of habitats but prefers Eucalypt woodland.

Galactia tenuiflora has compound leaves with three leaflets. Purple flowers occur in January and February. The inflorescence is axillary, with between one and three flowers per node. The pod is between 30 and 50mm in length, initially pale green but maturing to brown. Seeds are pale to dark brown, seven to nine per pod.
