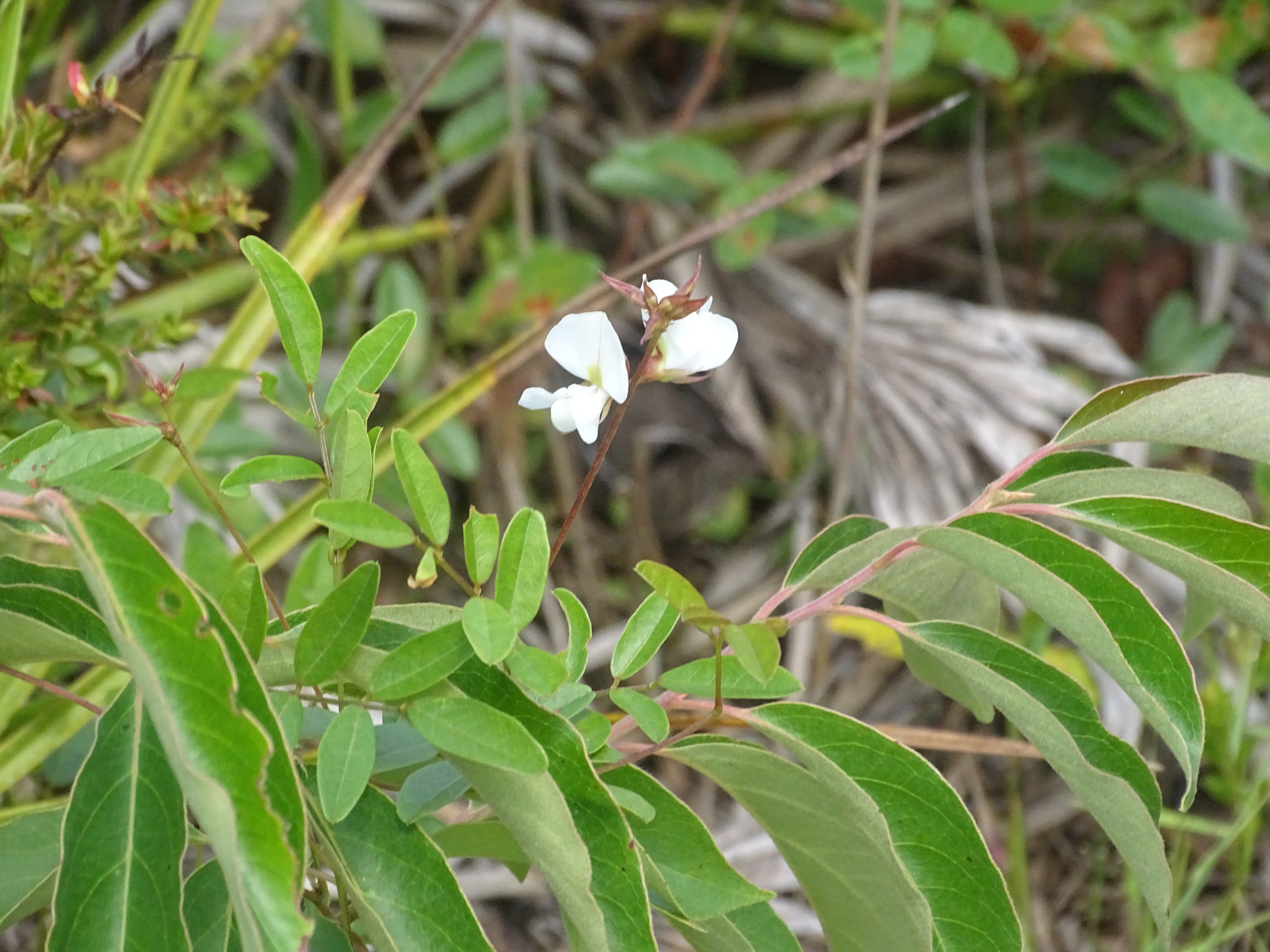

Conservation status
- Secure (NatureServe)

Scientific classification
- Kingdom: Plantae
- Clade: Embryophytes
- Clade: Tracheophytes
- Clade: Spermatophytes
- Clade: Angiosperms
- Clade: Eudicots
- Clade: Rosids
- Order: Fabales
- Family: Fabaceae
- Subfamily: Faboideae
- Genus: Galactia
- Species: G. elliottii

Binomial name
- Galactia elliottii Nutt. 1818

= Galactia elliottii =

Species of legume

Galactia elliottii, commonly known as Elliott's milkpea or white milkpea, is a species of flowering plant found in the south-eastern United States, a member of the family Fabaceae.

It is native to Florida, Georgia and South Carolina. It can be found in habitats such as sandy scrub, pine flatwoods, and dry pine woods.

It is a dicot with compound leaves ranging from 7 to 9 rounded leaflets. Leaves are light yellow when newly opening. It is a vining plant that can be found climbing or sprawled on the ground. Flowers and buds are white, on dark stems. Seed pods are lightly fuzzy and flattened, drying to dark brown. The seeds are small, round, and tan with darker brown stripes. The plants flower from March to September.

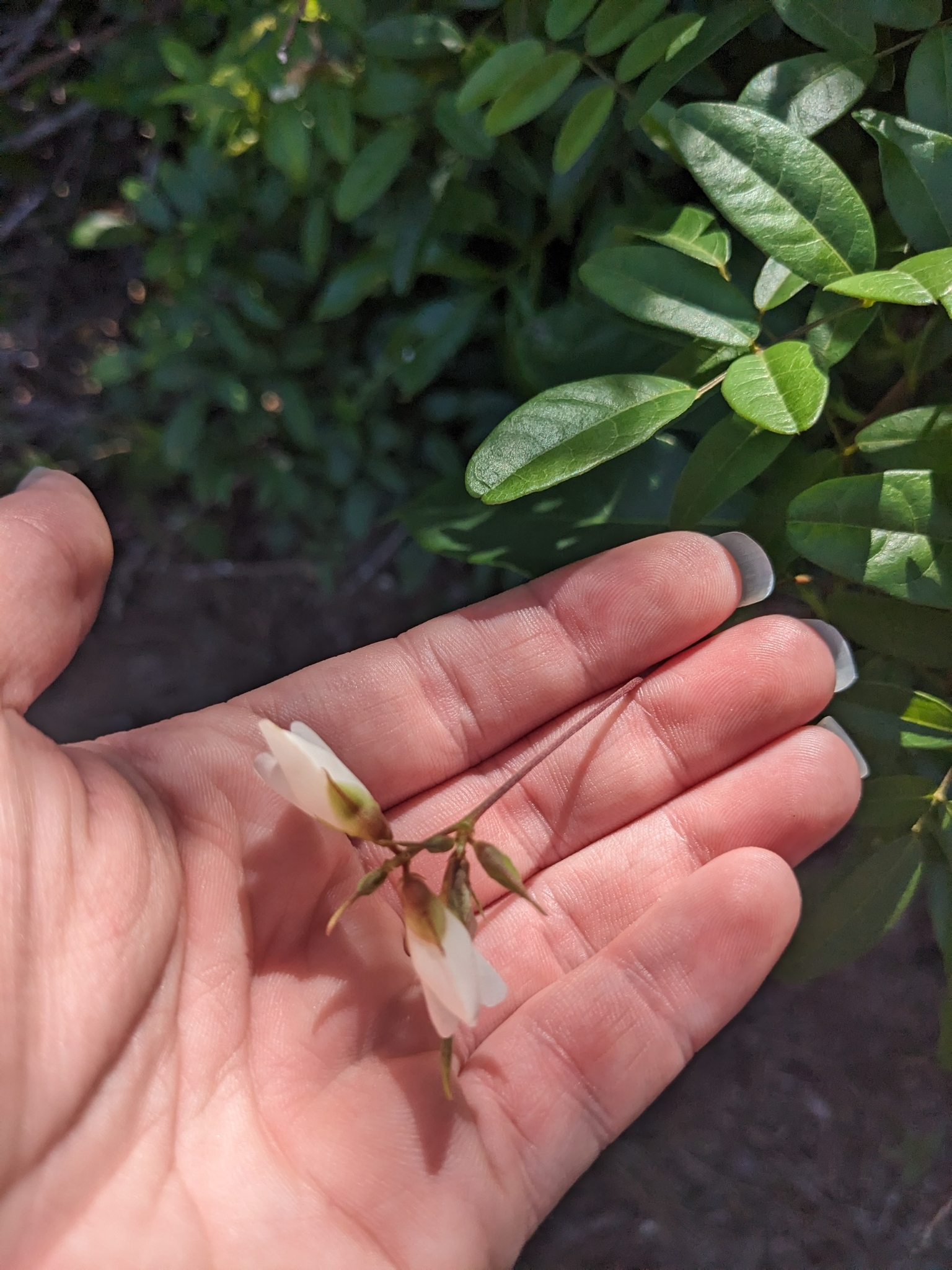
Galactia elliottii flower buds, with leaves visible

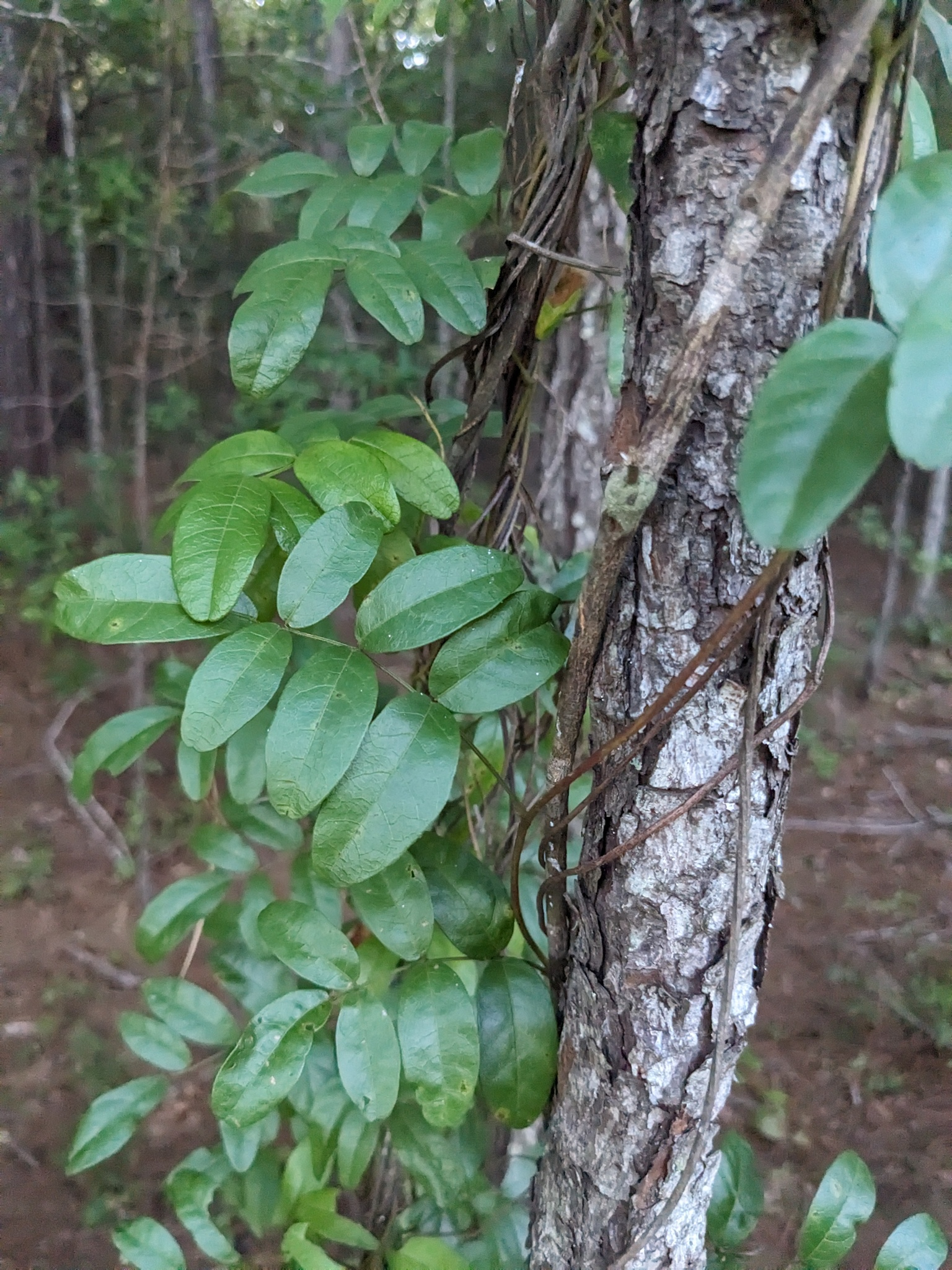
Galactia elliottii climbing a young pine tree

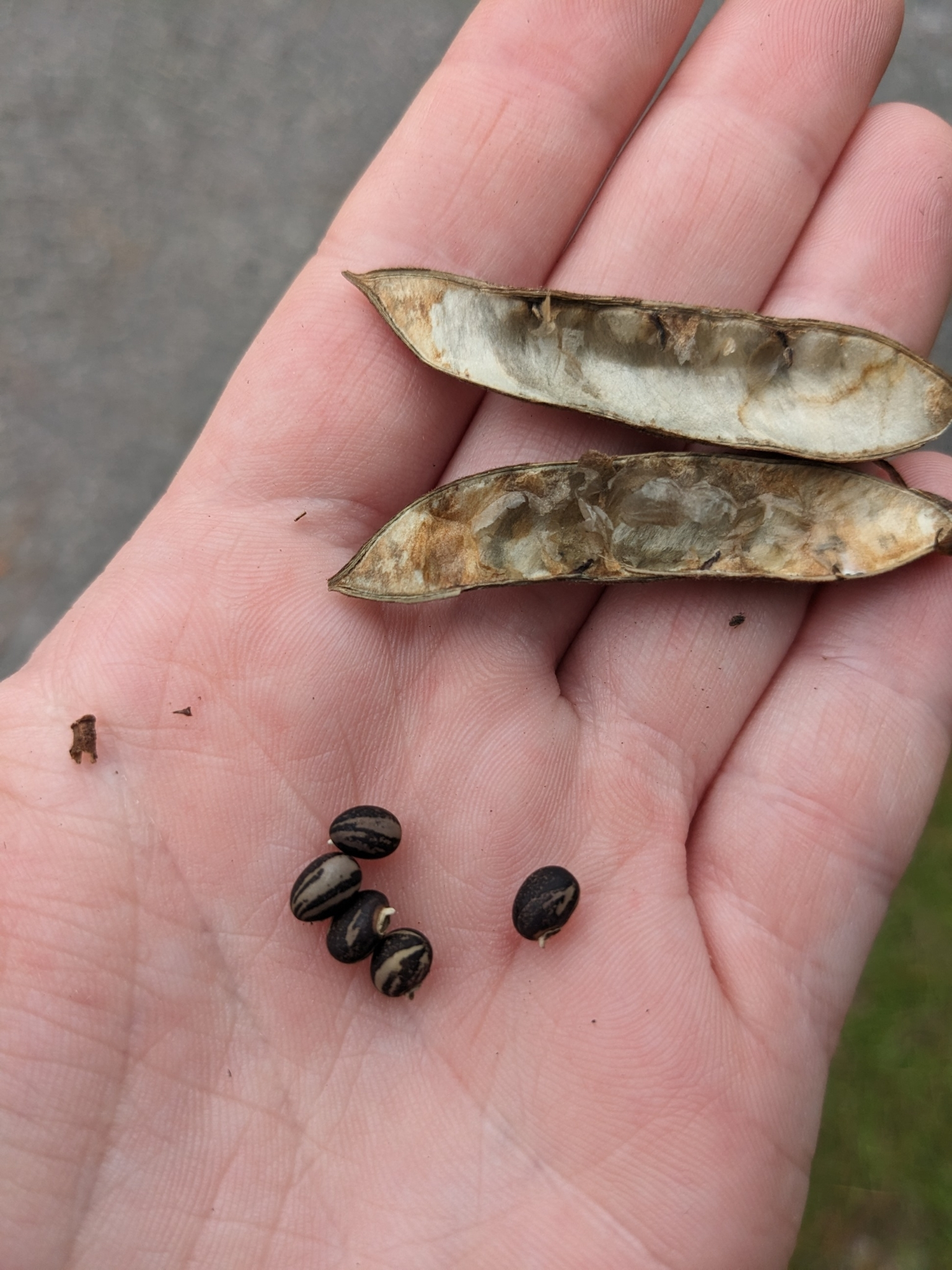
An open dried seed pod of Galactia elliottii, showing the seeds and inside of the pod
