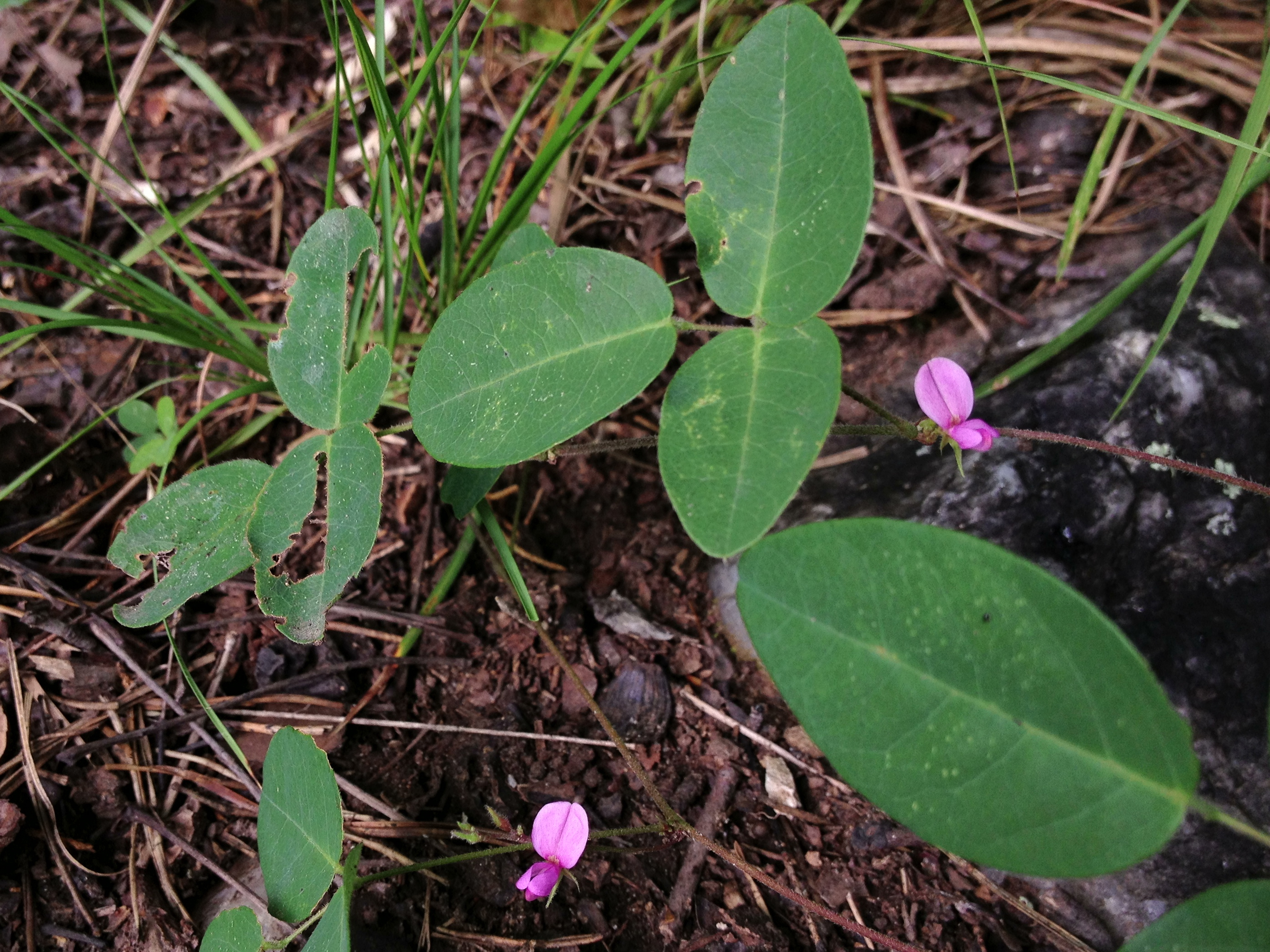

Scientific classification
- Kingdom: Plantae
- Clade: Tracheophytes
- Clade: Angiosperms
- Clade: Eudicots
- Clade: Rosids
- Order: Fabales
- Family: Fabaceae
- Subfamily: Faboideae
- Genus: Galactia
- Species: G. volubilis

Binomial name
- Galactia volubilis (L.) Britton

= Galactia volubilis =

Species of plant

Galactia volubilis, commonly known as McRee's milkpea, is a trailing or twining perennial herbaceous vine in the family Fabaceae, native to the southeastern United States.

== Description ==
Stems range from 0.4 to 1.2 meters in length and are minutely pubescent to nearly smooth. The leaves are typically 3-foliolate with oblong to elliptic leaflets measuring 2–3.5 cm long, glabrous above and slightly pubescent beneath. Flowers are reddish purple and arranged in axillary racemes 1–13 cm long. Each flower is subtended by small bracts and borne on a short, hairy pedicel. The calyx is sparsely pubescent, with lobes longer than the tube. The legume is 2–5 cm long, linear, and densely pubescent, splitting open at maturity with twisting valves to release seeds. Like other members of the genus Galactia, it has papilionaceous flowers, diadelphous stamens, and produces elongated, dehiscent pods.

== Distribution and habitat ==
Galactia volubilis is found in xeric areas with hot, wet summers and mild, dry winters. It is distributed from southeastern Virginia south to South Florida and west to central Arkansas and eastern Texas, and grows in longleaf pine sandhills and other dry forests and openings.

== Ecology ==
Galactia volubilis readily germinates from seed and resprouts in response to fire. It has been observed to increase in abundance in response to fire, although this may be as a result of the heat-shock from fire encouraging germination rather than a direct result of the fire.
