= Eriosema harmsianum =

Conservation status
- Least Concern (IUCN 3.1)

Scientific classification
- Kingdom: Plantae
- Clade: Tracheophytes
- Clade: Angiosperms
- Clade: Eudicots
- Clade: Rosids
- Order: Fabales
- Family: Fabaceae
- Subfamily: Faboideae
- Genus: Eriosema
- Species: E. harmsianum

Binomial name
- Eriosema harmsianum Dinter

Species of legume

Eriosema harmsianum is a species of legume in the family Fabaceae that is endemic to Namibia.
