= Galactia erecta =

Scientific classification
- Kingdom: Plantae
- Clade: Tracheophytes
- Clade: Angiosperms
- Clade: Eudicots
- Clade: Rosids
- Order: Fabales
- Family: Fabaceae
- Subfamily: Faboideae
- Genus: Galactia
- Species: G. erecta

Binomial name
- Galactia erecta (Walter) Vail.

Species of plant

Galactia erecta, or erect milkpea, is a species in the family Fabaceae, belonging to the genus Galactia, which includes trailing, twining, or climbing perennial vines, as well as erect herbaceous or rarely shrubby forms. It is native to the southeastern United States.

== Description ==
Galactia erecta is an erect perennial herb, typically growing 20–40 cm tall. The stems are glabrous or sparsely pubescent. Leaves are tri-foliolate with a short rachis (1–2 mm), and leaflets are linear-oblong to elliptic, mostly 1.5–4 cm long and glabrous. Inflorescences are subsessile axillary racemes, 1–2 cm long, bearing 1–6 pale purple to white flowers. Flowers are on short-pubescent pedicels (1–3 mm), each subtended by small triangular-subulate bracts. The calyx is short-pubescent, with a tube and lobes each 2–3 mm long; the standard petal is 7–8 mm. Fruits are linear legumes, 2–4 cm long and 5–8 mm wide, containing 6–10 seeds. The pods have short-pubescent valves and sutures.

== Distribution and habitat ==
Erect milkpea is found from southeastern North Carolina south to the Florida Panhandle, and west to eastern Texas. It grows in longleaf pine sandhill communities.

Erect milkpea is vulnerable to disturbance. It is often found in areas with native groundcover and struggles to reestablish in native savannas that were disturbed by agricultural use.

== Ecology ==
Galactia erecta flowers from April through July, and fruits from July to September. It is known to increase in density with the reintroduction of fire disturbance to its habitat, and is a characteristic species in a variety of fire-dependent habitats.

It has been observed being consumed as a food source by gopher tortoises.
