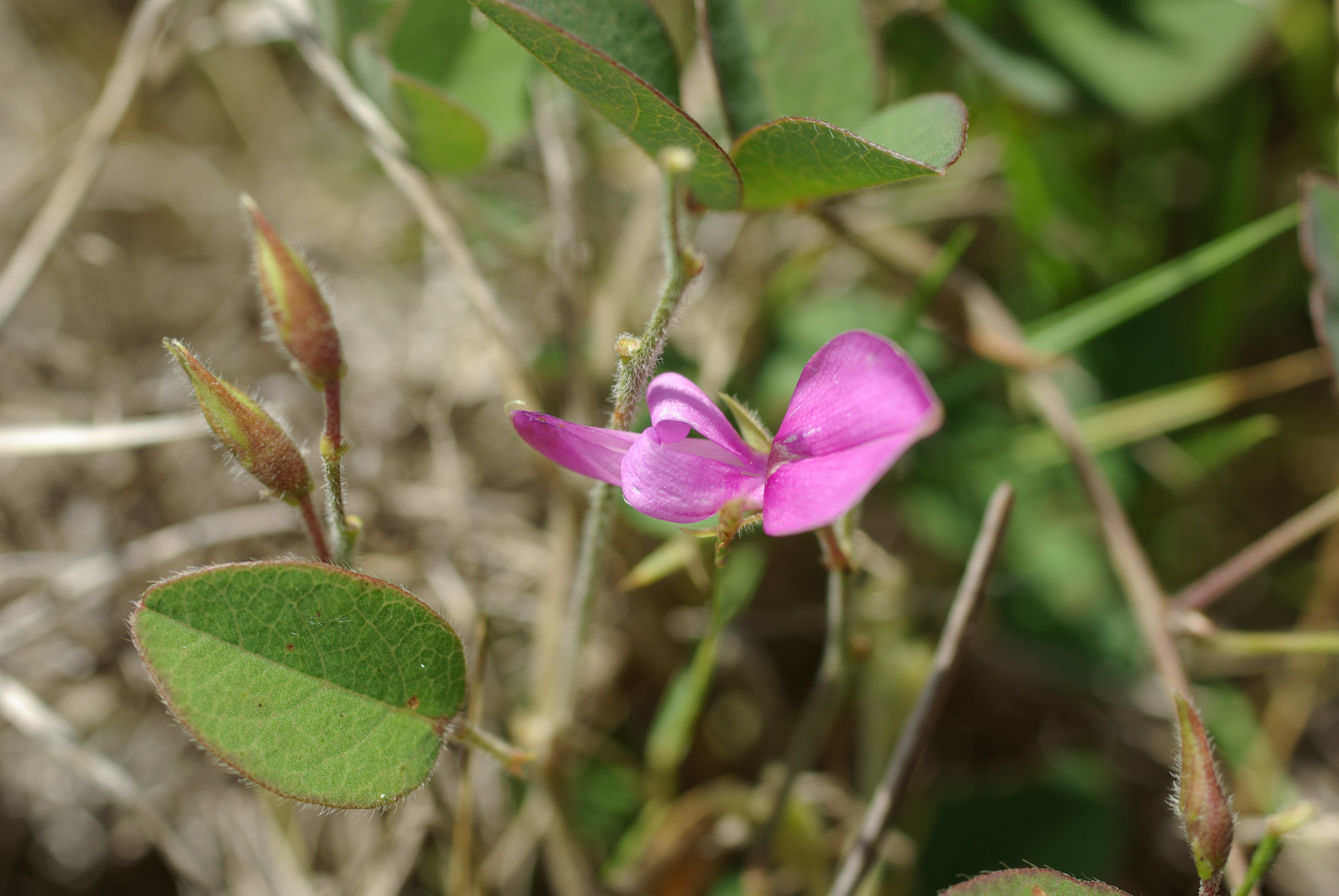

Conservation status
- Critically Imperiled (NatureServe)

Scientific classification
- Kingdom: Plantae
- Clade: Tracheophytes
- Clade: Angiosperms
- Clade: Eudicots
- Clade: Rosids
- Order: Fabales
- Family: Fabaceae
- Subfamily: Faboideae
- Genus: Galactia
- Species: G. smallii

Binomial name
- Galactia smallii H.J.Rogers ex Herndon

= Galactia smallii =

Species of legume

Galactia smallii is a rare species of flowering plant in the legume family known by the common name Small's milkpea. It is endemic to Florida, where it is known only from a few small patches of remaining habitat in Miami-Dade County. It is threatened by the destruction and inadequate management of its habitat. It was federally listed as an endangered species of the United States in 1985.

== Description ==
This plant is a creeping or climbing vine with gray-haired stems reaching up to 2 meters long. The shaggy hairs on the stem nodes may be up to 8 millimeters long. Each leaf is compound, made up of three hairy leaflets that measure 1 to 2 centimeters long. The inflorescence produces 1 to 5 pea flowers which are just over a centimeter long and pink to lavender in color. The flowers are pollinated by the Cassius blue butterfly (Leptotes cassius theonus) and other insects. The fruit is a hairy legume pod 3 or 4 centimeters long and a few millimeters wide.

== Habitat ==
This species grows in Florida's pine rockland habitat, an increasingly rare type of ecosystem dominated by the slash pine (Pinus elliottii). The trees are narrow and the canopy is open, providing sunlight to the understory. Among the pines are over 100 species of trees, including many palms, and a diverse array of herbs, including many rare and endemic species. The habitat is maintained by a natural fire regime of periodic wildfire which prevents the succession of the pine rockland to a hammock ecosystem. Fire clears overgrown tall and woody vegetation to maintain the characteristic open canopy. Less than 2% of the pine rocklands of Florida remain today.

== Management and status ==
When this plant was added to the endangered species list it was known from only two places near Homestead, Florida. The habitat was being rapidly consumed and converted to residential tracts in the Miami metropolitan area. Remaining fragmented strips of the habitat were becoming degraded, primarily by the practice of fire suppression. The area, which would normally burn every 3 to 7 years, was becoming overgrown and the habitat was changing from pine rockland to hammock. In the absence of fire the open canopy fills in with brush and mature trees and Small's milkpea cannot tolerate the shade.

Appropriate land management in the pine rocklands involves controlled burns to mimic the natural pattern. Fire also helps to prevent the encroachment of invasive plants. One of the worst offenders is Natal grass (Melinis repens).

The plant is present at eight sites on public land and an unknown number of sites on private property. The County of Miami-Dade has purchased some tracts of land that contain the plant for the purpose of managing and conserving them. The largest population is located on public, county-owned land near the Homestead Joint Air Reserve Base, and negotiations are underway to develop a plan for the land.
