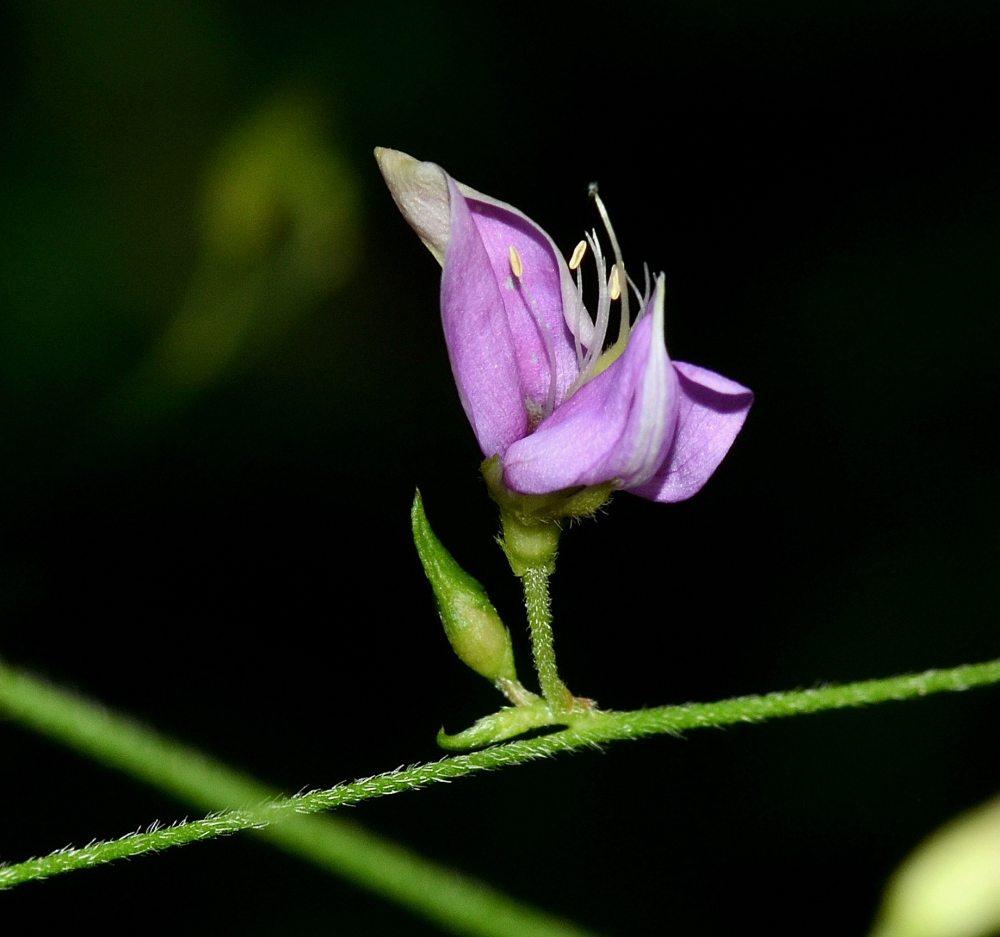

Scientific classification
- Kingdom: Plantae
- Clade: Tracheophytes
- Clade: Angiosperms
- Clade: Eudicots
- Clade: Rosids
- Order: Fabales
- Family: Fabaceae
- Subfamily: Faboideae
- Genus: Galactia
- Species: G. mollis

Binomial name
- Galactia mollis Michx.

= Galactia mollis =

Species of legume

Galactia mollis, the soft milkpea, is a species of flowering plant in the southeastern United States in the family Fabaceae. It is a dicot. It is an endangered species threatened by urban development in its natural habitat.

== Description ==
The stems of G. mollis may reach up to 1.5 meters (approximately 4.9 feet) in length. Its leaves are oblong to elliptic in shape, and reach 2 to 4 centimeters in length.

== Distribution and habitat ==
G. mollis's range stretches from North Carolina to peninsular Florida and westward to the Florida panhandle and Alabama.

Within this region, this species have been observed growing in habitats such as sandhills, woodlands, scrub, and pinelands. It can be found in open areas with sandy soils.
