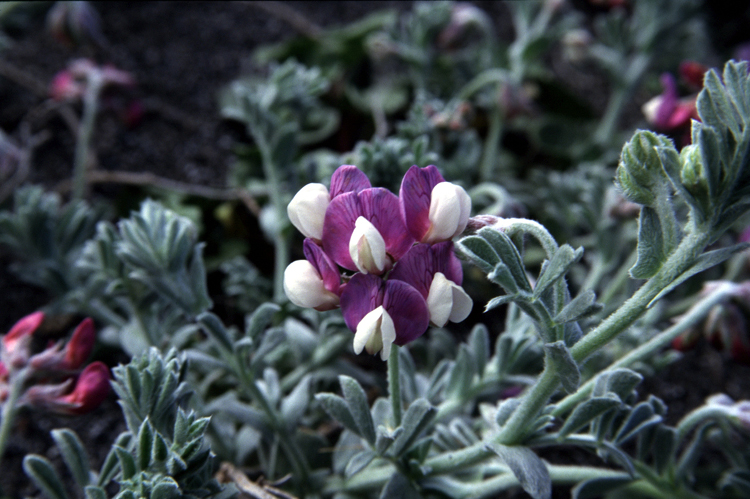

Conservation status
- Vulnerable (NatureServe)

Scientific classification
- Kingdom: Plantae
- Clade: Tracheophytes
- Clade: Angiosperms
- Clade: Eudicots
- Clade: Rosids
- Order: Fabales
- Family: Fabaceae
- Subfamily: Faboideae
- Genus: Lathyrus
- Species: L. littoralis

Binomial name
- Lathyrus littoralis (Nutt.) Endl. ex Walp.

Synonyms
- Astrophia littoralis Nutt.; Orobus littoralis (Nutt.) A.Gray

= Lathyrus littoralis =

Plant species in the pea family

Lathyrus littoralis is a species of wild pea known by the common name silky beach pea. It is native to the coastline of western North America from southern British Columbia to California. It is a resident of beaches and dunes.

This is a perennial herb which grows a patch of hairy gray-green stems along the sandy ground or slightly upright. The woolly leaves are made up of several oval or oblong scoop-shaped leaflets. There are small, tough tendrils but the plant does not use them to climb. The plant produces dense inflorescences of several flowers each one to two centimeters wide. Each flower is bicolored in dark-veined deep pink and white. The fruit is a dehiscent oval-shaped hairy legume pod. It blooms from late spring to early summer.

The roots are edible.

== Taxonomy ==
In 1838 Thomas Nuttall scientifically described a new species in a new genus, Astrophia, naming it Astrophia littoralis. In 1842 Wilhelm Gerhard Walpers moved it to Lathyrus, attributing the name Lathyrus littoralis to Stephan Endlicher. The genus Astrophia is also regarded as a synonym of Lathyrus. One other reclassification to Orobus was proposed in 1860 by Asa Gray. Along with the rest of its genus, the species is part of the Fabaceae family.
