= Megachile albitarsis =

Scientific classification
- Domain: Eukaryota
- Kingdom: Animalia
- Phylum: Arthropoda
- Class: Insecta
- Order: Hymenoptera
- Family: Megachilidae
- Genus: Megachile
- Species: M. albitarsis

Binomial name
- Megachile albitarsis Cresson, 1872

Species of leafcutter bee (Megachile)

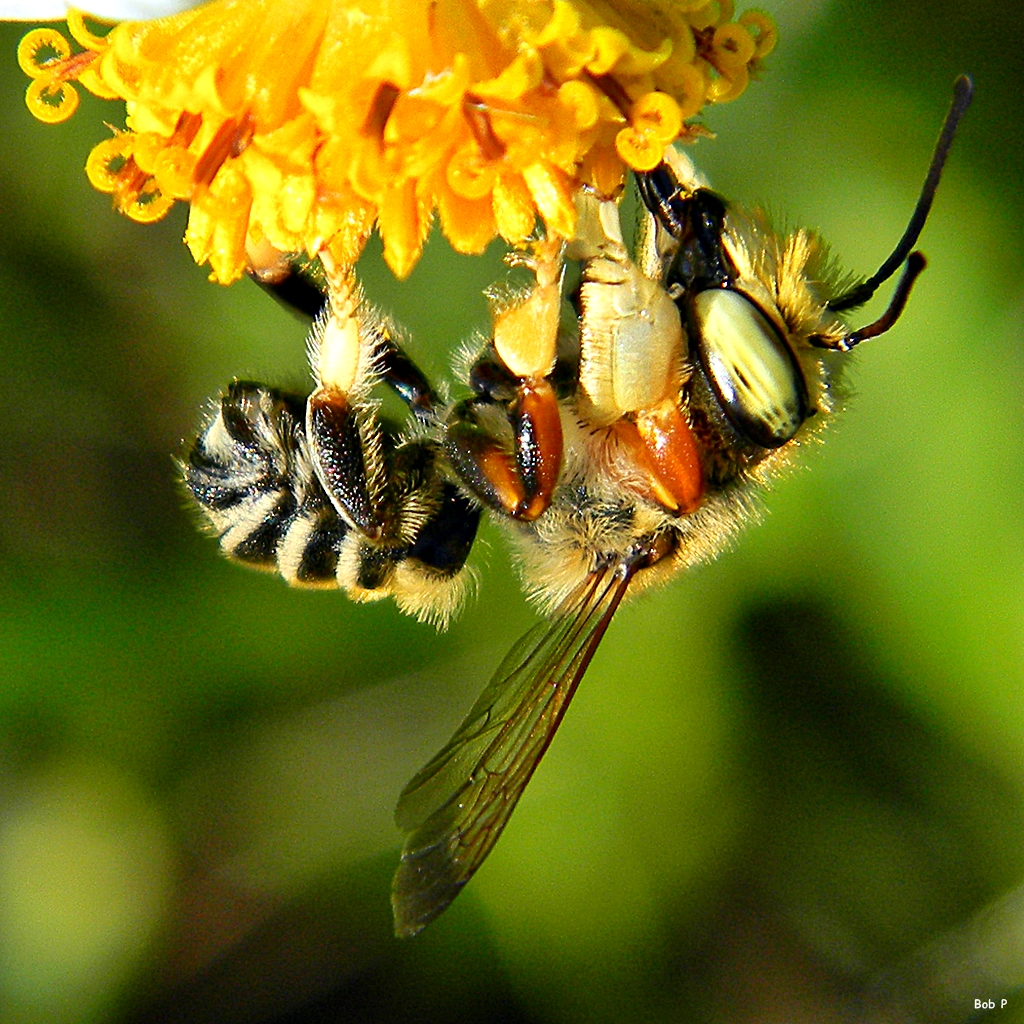
Megachile albitarsis - White-footed Leafcutter Bee.

Megachile albitarsis is a species of bee in the family Megachilidae. It was described by Ezra Townsend Cresson in 1872. The species is a common pollinator of Sabal etonia.
