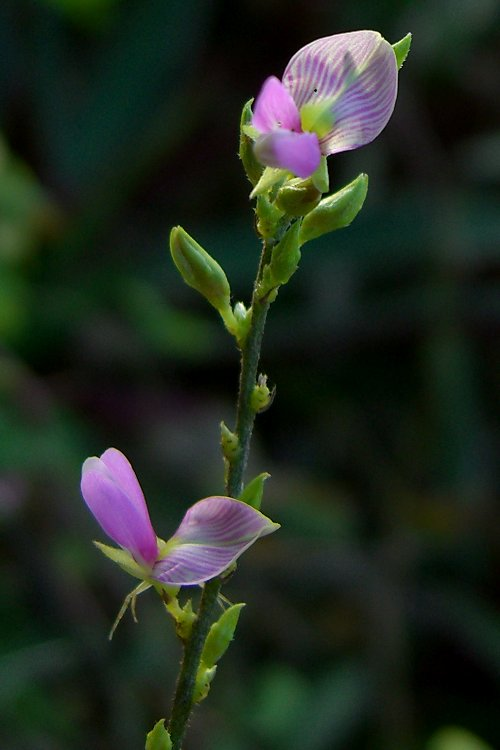
- Galactia striata

Scientific classification
- Kingdom: Plantae
- Clade: Tracheophytes
- Clade: Angiosperms
- Clade: Eudicots
- Clade: Rosids
- Order: Fabales
- Family: Fabaceae
- Subfamily: Faboideae
- Tribe: Diocleae
- Genus: Galactia; P.Browne (1756)

Species
- About 100. See text.

Synonyms
- Galaction St.-Lag. (1880); Heterocarpaea Scheele (1848); Leucodyction Dalzell (1850); Odonia Bertol. (1822); Sweetia DC. (1825), nom. rej.

= Galactia =

Genus of legumes

Galactia is a genus of plants in the legume family (Fabaceae). It belongs to the subfamily Faboideae and tribe Diocleae They do not have an unambiguous common name, being commonly called milk peas, beach peas or wild peas. They are perennial herbs or subshrubs with prostrate, climbing, or erect forms.

The genus contains 99 species which range through the Americas from New York and Arizona to northern Argentina, in tropical Africa and Madagascar, in south and southeast Asia, southern China, and Japan, and in the Philippines, eastern Indonesia, New Guinea, and Australia.

Typical habitats include seasonally-dry tropical and subtropical forest margins, thickets, woodlands, wooded grasslands, grasslands, and rocky shrublands.

== Species ==
99 species are currently accepted.

- Galactia acapulcensis Rose
- Galactia acunana Borhidi & O.Muñiz
- Galactia albiflora Urb.
- Galactia anisopoda Ohwi
- Galactia anomala Lundell
- Galactia argentea Brandegee
- Galactia argentifolia S.Moore
- Galactia augusti Harms
- Galactia austrofloridensis A.R.Franck
- Galactia bahamensis Urb.
- Galactia benthamiana Micheli
- Galactia brachyodon Griseb.
- Galactia buchii Urb.
- Galactia burkartii Fortunato
- Galactia caimitensis Urb. & Ekman
- Galactia canescens Benth.
- Galactia carnea Urb. & Ekman
- Galactia combsii Urb.
- Galactia cordifolia Ceolin & Miotto
- Galactia cuneata Alain
- Galactia cuspidata Teijsm. & Binn.
- Galactia densiflora M.T.Germán, R.Sousa & M.Sousa
- Galactia dictyophylla Urb.
- Galactia dimorphophylla Fortunato, Sede & Luckow
- Galactia dubia DC.
- Galactia earlei Britton
- Galactia eggersii Urb.
- Galactia elliottii Nutt.
- Galactia elliptifoliola Merr.
- Galactia erecta (Walter) Vail
- Galactia excisa Urb. & Ekman
- Galactia fiebrigiana Burkart
- Galactia filiformis (Jacq.) Benth.
- Galactia floridana Torr. & A.Gray
- Galactia fuertesii Urb.
- Galactia galactioides (Griseb.) Hitchc.
- Galactia glaucescens Kunth
- Galactia glaucophylla Harms
- Galactia glomerata Urb.
- Galactia herradurensis Urb.
- Galactia heterophylla A.Gray
- Galactia incana (Rose) Standl.
- Galactia isopoda Urb.
- Galactia jenningsii Britton
- Galactia joselyniae G.L.Nesom
- Galactia jussiaeana Kunth
- Galactia killipiana J.F.Macbr.
- Galactia laotica Thuan
- Galactia latifolia (Baker) Thuan
- Galactia latisiliqua Desv.
- Galactia laxifolia Urb.
- Galactia lignosa (Turpin ex Pers.) Urb.
- Galactia lindenii Burkart
- Galactia lockhartii Griseb.
- Galactia longiflora Arn.
- Galactia longifolia (Jacq.) Benth.
- Galactia longipes Gagnep.
- Galactia maisiana Alain
- Galactia megalophylla (F.Muell.)
- Galactia microphylla (Chapm.) H.J.Rogers ex Isely
- Galactia minarum Standl. & Steyerm.
- Galactia minutiflora Urb.
- Galactia mollis Michx.
- Galactia monophylla Griseb.
- Galactia muelleri Benth.
- Galactia multiflora B.L.Rob.
- Galactia nummularia Urb.
- Galactia ocoana Urb. & Ekman
- Galactia parvifolia A.Rich.
- Galactia pendula Pers.
- Galactia pinetorum Small
- Galactia purshii Desv.
- Galactia regularis (L.) Britton, Sterns & Poggenb. (= G. volubilis)
- Galactia remansoana Harms
- Galactia revoluta Urb.
- Galactia rotundata Alain
- Galactia rubra (Jacq.) Urb.
- Galactia sangsterae Proctor
- Galactia savannarum Britton
- Galactia schomburgkii Urb.
- Galactia serpentina G.L.Nesom
- Galactia shumbae Harms
- Galactia simaoensis Y.Y.Qian
- Galactia smallii H.J.Rogers ex A.Herndon
- Galactia sparsiflora Standl. & Steyerm.
- Galactia spiciformis Torr. & A.Gray
- Galactia striata (Jacq.) Urb.
  - Galactia striata var. crassirachis Burkart
  - Galactia striata var. striata
  - Galactia striata var. villosa (Wight & Arn.) Verdc. (= G. tenuiflora var. villosa)
- Galactia suberecta Britton
- Galactia synandra Urb.
- Galactia tashiroi Maxim.
- Galactia tenuiflora (Willd.) Wight & Arn.
  - Galactia tenuiflora var. lucida
- Galactia texana (Scheele) A.Gray
- Galactia trinitensis Urb.
- Galactia tuberosa DC.
- Galactia uniflora Urb.
- Galactia vietnamensis Thuan
- Galactia volubilis (L.) Britton
- Galactia watsoniana W.C.Holmes & Singhurst
- Galactia weddelliana Benth.
- Galactia wrightii A.Gray
