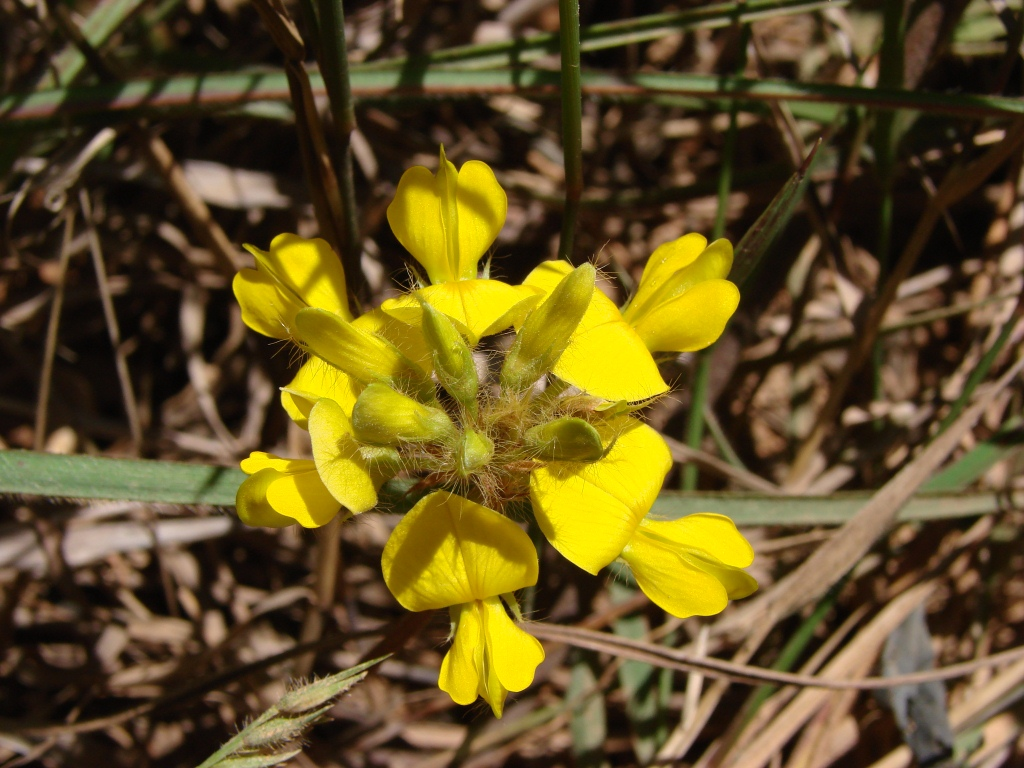
- Eriosema campestre, Brazil

Scientific classification
- Kingdom: Plantae
- Clade: Tracheophytes
- Clade: Angiosperms
- Clade: Eudicots
- Clade: Rosids
- Order: Fabales
- Family: Fabaceae
- Subfamily: Faboideae
- Clade: Millettioids
- Tribe: Phaseoleae
- Subtribe: Cajaninae
- Genus: Eriosema (DC.) Desv.

Type species
- Eriosema rufum (Kunth) G.Don

Species
- See text

Synonyms
- Eriosema G.Don; Euriosma Desv.; Pyrrhotrichia Wight & Arn.; Rhynchosia sect. Eriosema DC.

= Eriosema =

Genus of legumes

Eriosema is a genus of flowering plants in the family Fabaceae. Accepted species number over 150. The genus is widespread in tropics.

== Description ==
Species of Eriosema are mostly herbs or shrublets. Leaves are pinnately 3-foliolate, rarely reduced to a single leaflet. Inflorescences are 1–2-flowered or pedunculate racemes in the leaf axils, yellow to orange, calyx is campanulate, consists of five similar lobes. Pods are short and flattened with two seeds.

== Selected species ==
- Eriosema campestre Benth. — Argentina, Paraguay, Brazil
- Eriosema chinense Vogel — South-East Asia, East Himalaya, India, New Guinea, Australia
- Eriosema defoliatum Benth. — Brazil
- Eriosema glabrum Mart. ex Benth. — Argentina, Brazil
- Eriosema glaziovii Harms — Brazil
- Eriosema harmsianum Dinter — Namibia
- Eriosema kraussianum Meisn. — South Africa
- Eriosema longifolium Benth. — Brazil, Bolivia, Colombia, Paraguay
- Eriosema salignum E.Mey. — South Africa
- Eriosema stenophyllum Harms — Brazil
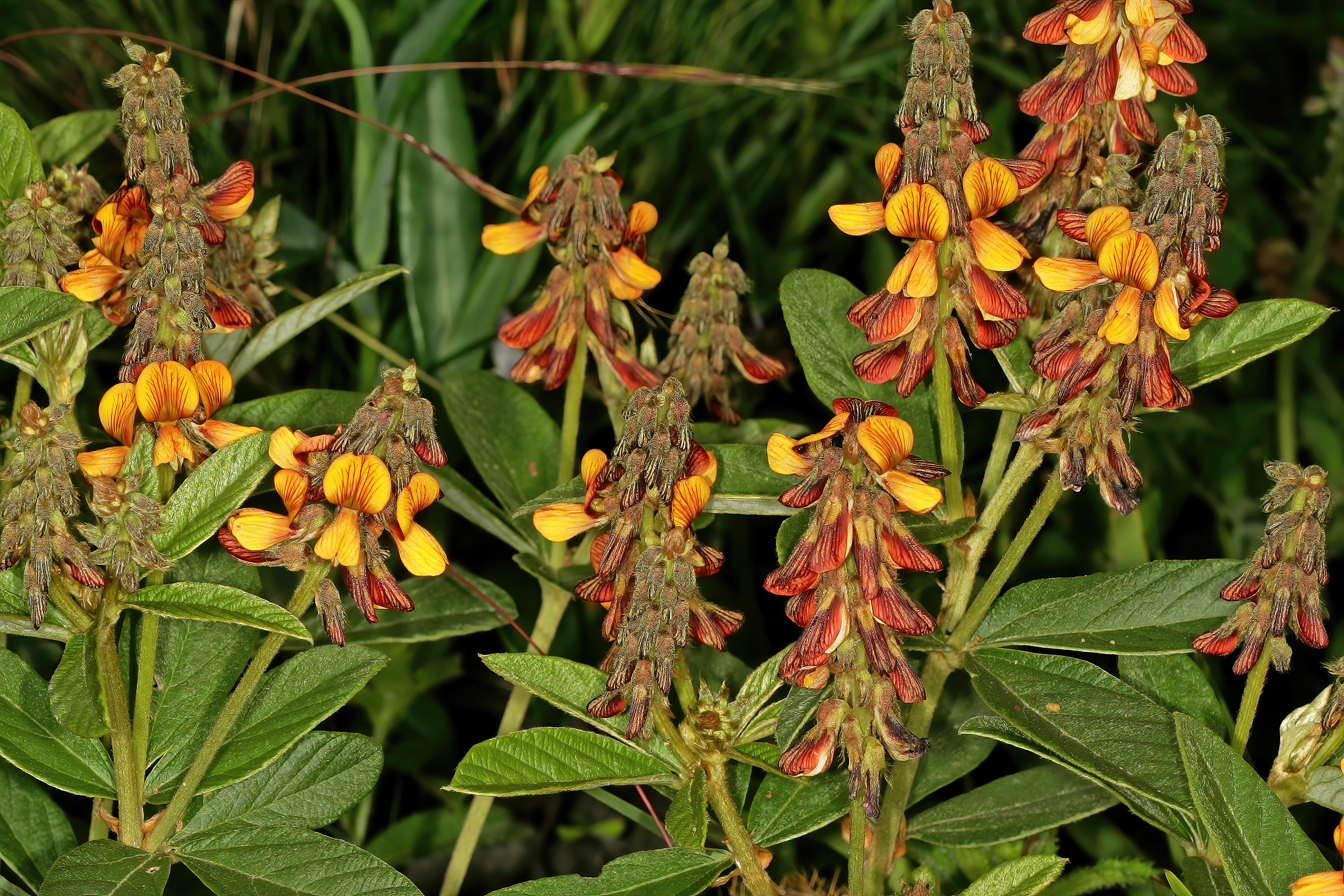
Eriosema umtamvunense in Umtamvuna Nature Reserve

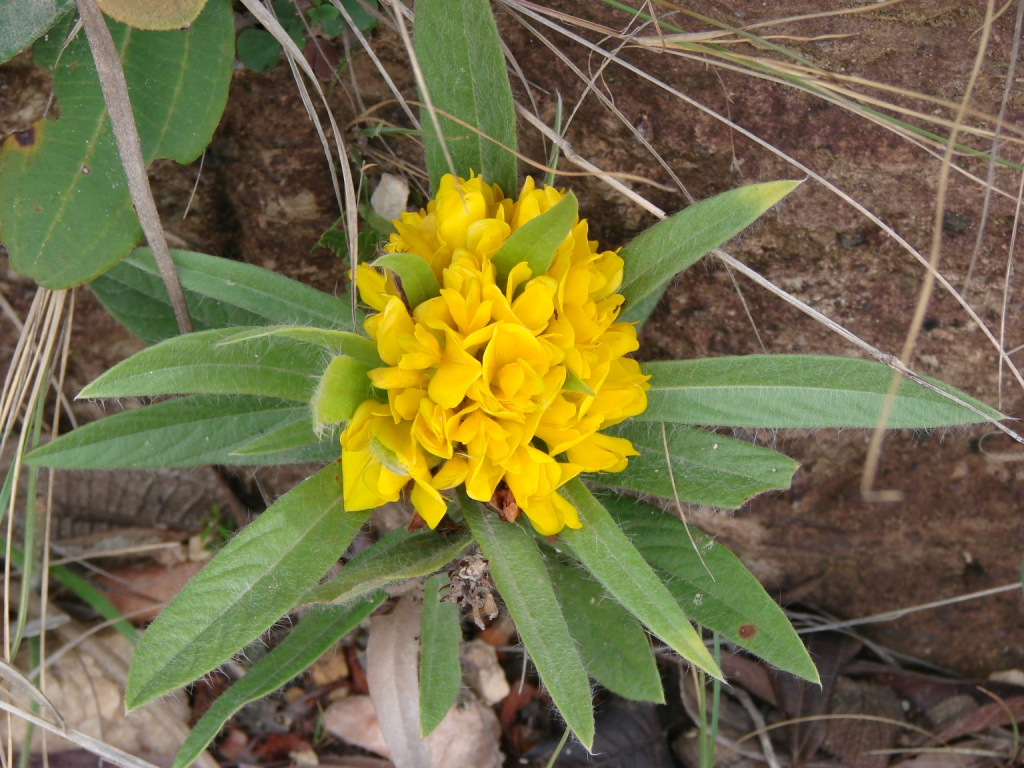
Eriosema longifolium in Chapada dos Veadeiros National Park

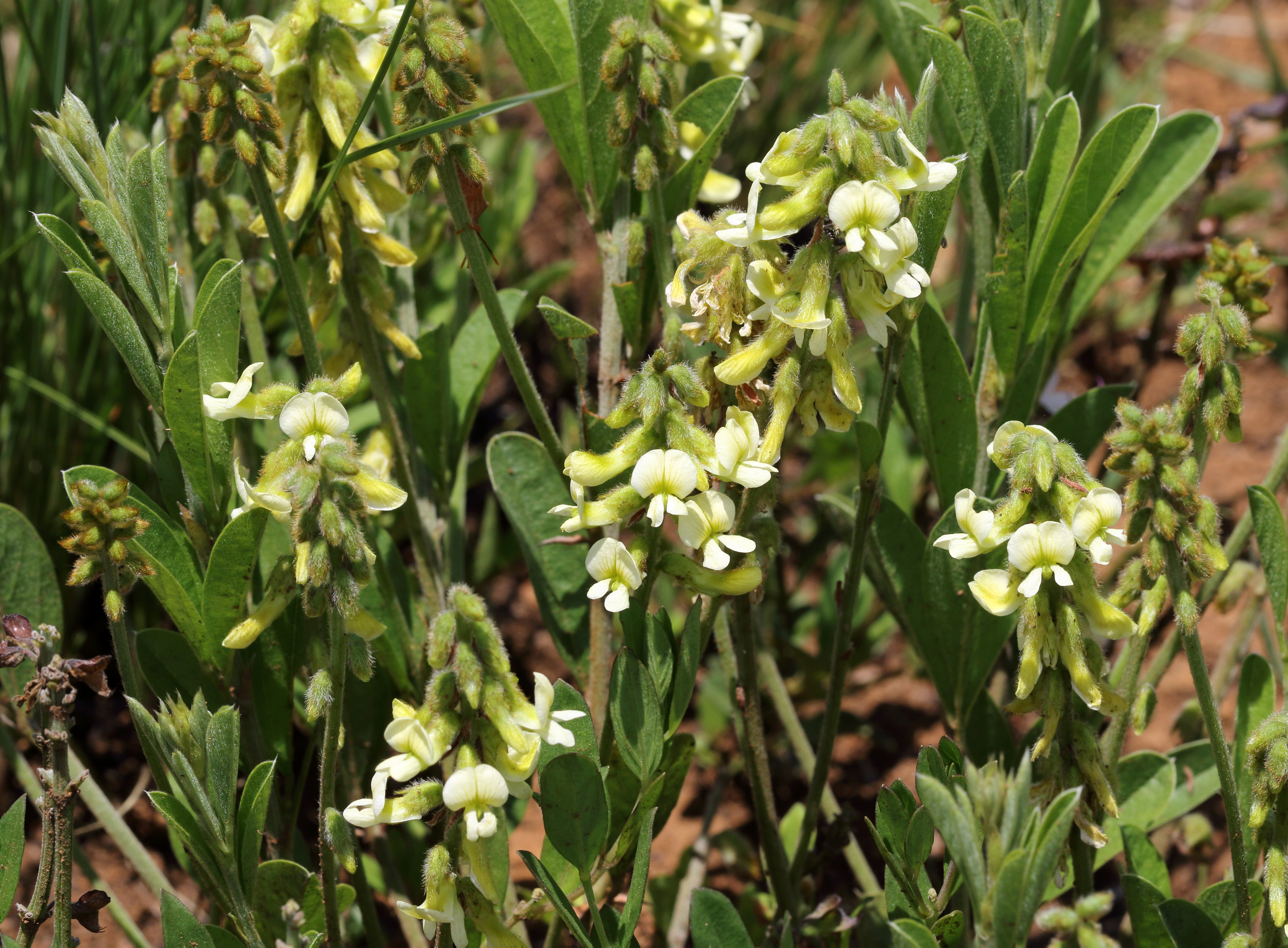
Eriosema kraussianum in KwaZulu-Natal

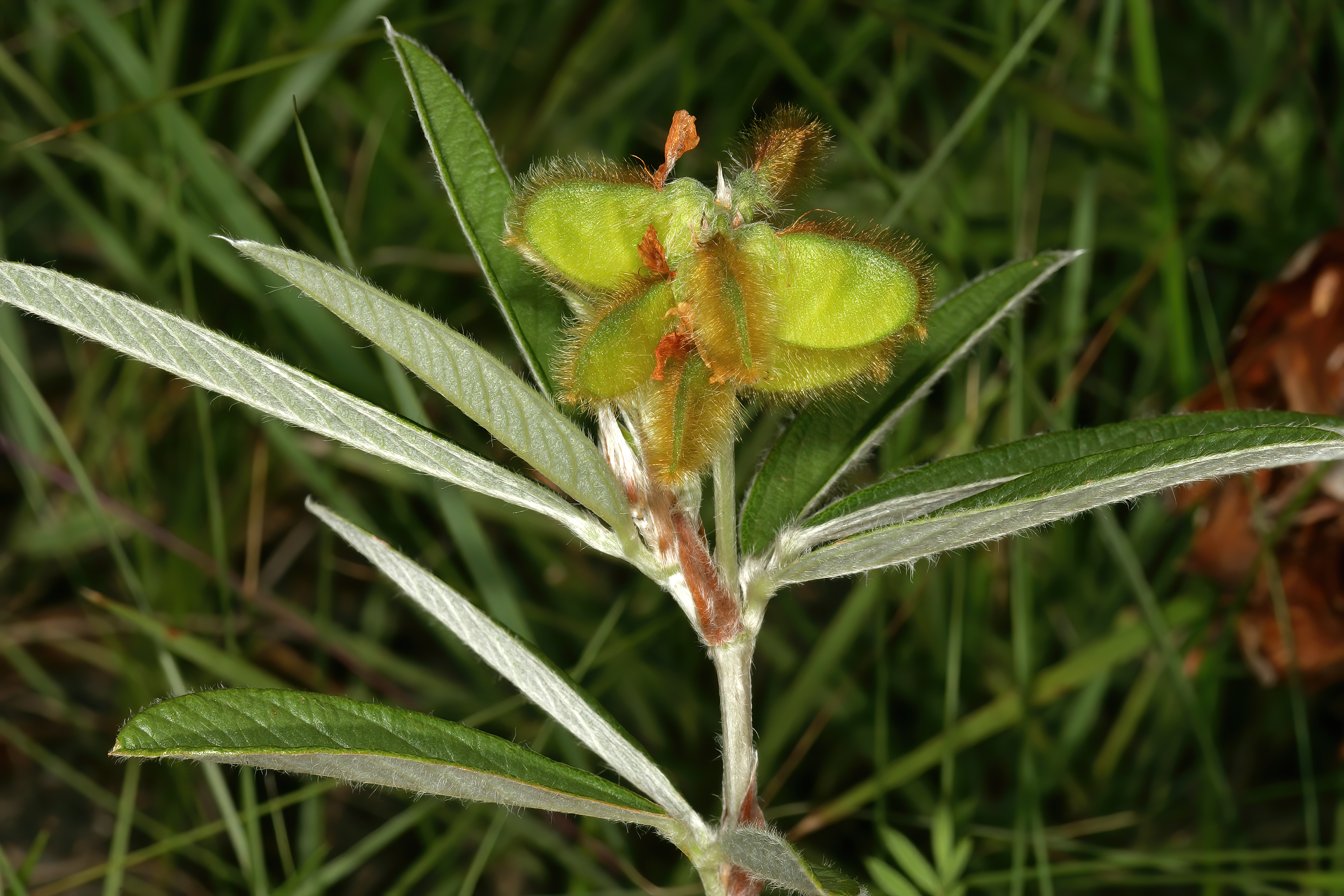
Eriosema salignum in fruit in South Africa.

== Uses ==
Root tubers of Eriosema species have been traditional food for Aborigines of the Northern Territory.
