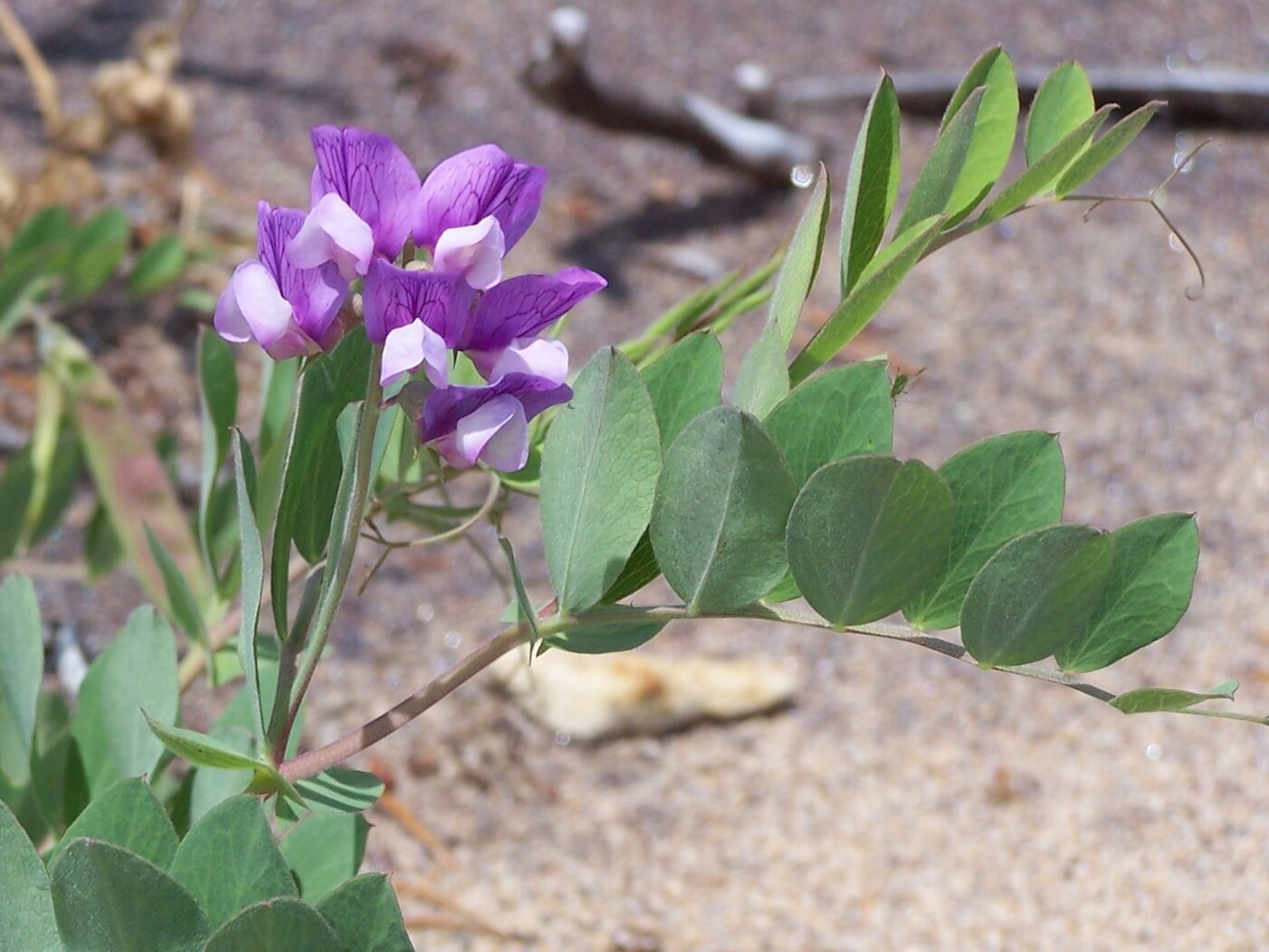

Conservation status
- Secure (NatureServe)

Scientific classification
- Kingdom: Plantae
- Clade: Tracheophytes
- Clade: Angiosperms
- Clade: Eudicots
- Clade: Rosids
- Order: Fabales
- Family: Fabaceae
- Subfamily: Faboideae
- Genus: Lathyrus
- Species: L. japonicus

Binomial name
- Lathyrus japonicus Willd.

Synonyms
- List: Lathyrus aleuticus; Lathyrus californicus; Lathyrus hultenii; Lathyrus japonicus var. acutifolius; Lathyrus japonicus f. acutifolius; Lathyrus japonicus var. albescens; Lathyrus japonicus f. albescens; Lathyrus japonicus f. albiflorus; Lathyrus japonicus f. albinus; Lathyrus japonicus var. aleuticus; Lathyrus japonicus f. candidus; Lathyrus japonicus var. glaber; Lathyrus japonicus subsp. maritimus; Lathyrus japonicus subsp. pubescens; Lathyrus japonicus var. pubescens; Lathyrus japonicus f. pubescens; Lathyrus japonicus f. spectabilis; Lathyrus japonicus var. typicus; Lathyrus maritimus; Lathyrus maritimus; Lathyrus maritimus subsp. acutifolius; Lathyrus maritimus var. acutifolius; Lathyrus maritimus var. albescens; Lathyrus maritimus f. albescens; Lathyrus maritimus f. albiflorus; Lathyrus maritimus var. aleuticus; Lathyrus maritimus subsp. glaber; Lathyrus maritimus var. glaber; Lathyrus maritimus var. pellitus; Lathyrus maritimus subsp. pubescens; Lathyrus maritimus var. pubescens; Lathyrus maritimus f. pubescens; Lathyrus maritimus f. subpubescens; Lathyrus maritimus var. velutinus; Lathyrus venosus; Orobus japonicus; Orobus maritimus; Pisum dasigynum; Pisum maritimum; Pisum maritimum var. glabrum; Pisum maritimum var. minus; Pisum maritimum var. pubescens; Pisum multiflorum

= Lathyrus japonicus =

Plant species in the pea family

Lathyrus japonicus, the sea pea, beach pea, circumpolar pea or sea vetchling, is a species of flowering plant in the legume family Fabaceae, native to temperate coastal areas of the Northern Hemisphere.

It is a herbaceous perennial growing trailing stems 50–80 cm (20–31 in) long, typically on sand and gravel storm beaches. The leaves are waxy glaucous green, 5–10 cm (2.0–3.9 in) long, pinnate, with 2-5 pairs of leaflets, the terminal leaflet usually replaced by a twining tendril. The flowers are broad, with a dark purple standard petal and paler purple wing and keel petals; they are produced in racemes of up to twelve flowers.

== Description ==
Lathyrus japonicus is a perennial plant. The stem grows to 15 to 30 cm (6 to 12 in) and is limp, has no wings and is often hairless. The leaves are alternate, greyish green and somewhat succulent, almost stalkless with large, wide stipules. The leaf blades are pinnate with three to five pairs of narrow lanceolate leaflets with blunt tips, entire margins and a terminal tendril. The inflorescence has a long stem and five to twelve purple flowers, each 14 to 20 mm (0.6 to 0.8 in) long, turning bluer as they age. These have five sepals and five petals and are irregular with a standard, two wings and a fused keel. There are ten stamens and a single carpel. The fruit is a long brown pod up to 50 mm (2.0 in) in length. This plant flowers in mid-to-late summer (July and August in the Northern Hemisphere, January and February in the Southern Hemisphere).

== Taxonomy ==
The botanist Carl Ludwig Willdenow scientifically described Lathyrus japonicus in 1802. It was proposed by Friedrich Alefeld that it be moved to Orobus in 1861, but the classification in Lathyrus continues to be accepted. Alongside the rest of its genus it is part of the Fabaceae family and the species has four accepted varieties.

- Lathyrus japonicus var. japonicus – Native to northeastern Europe, east Siberia, China, Japan, and North America
- Lathyrus japonicus var. maritimus – Native to North America, northern Europe, and Kamchatka
- Lathyrus japonicus var. parviflorus – Native to Manitoba, Ontario, and Ohio
- Lathyrus japonicus var. pellitus – Native to eastern North America parts of Asia and northeastern Europe

Lathyrus japonicus has 43 synonyms of the species or of three of its four varieties, including 11 species names.

Table of Species Synonyms
Name	Year	Synonym of:	Notes
Lathyrus aleuticus (Greene) Pobed.	1959	var. japonicus	= het.
Lathyrus californicus Douglas	1828	var. maritimus	= het.
Lathyrus hultenii J.Rousseau & Raymond	1969	var. japonicus	= het.
Lathyrus maritimus (L.) Fr.	1845	var. maritimus	≡ hom., nom. illeg. homonym. post.
Lathyrus maritimus Bigelow	1840	var. maritimus	= het.
Lathyrus venosus Sweet	1823	var. japonicus	= het., nom. illeg. homonym. post.
Orobus japonicus (Willd.) Alef.	1861	L. japonicus	≡ hom.
Orobus maritimus (L.) Rchb.	1832	var. maritimus	≡ hom.
Pisum dasigynum Raf.	1819	var. maritimus	= het.
Pisum maritimum L.	1753	var. maritimus	≡ hom.
Pisum multiflorum Stokes	1812	var. maritimus	= het.
Notes: ≡ homotypic synonym; = heterotypic synonym

== Distribution and habitat ==
Lathyrus japonicus is native to temperate parts of Europe, Asia, and North America. It an introduced species in central Chile, in South America. Its typical habitat is sandy or stony seashores and other coastal locations. The unusually extensive native range is explained by the ability of the seeds to remain viable while floating in sea water for up to five years, enabling the seeds to drift nearly worldwide. Germination occurs when waves abrade the hard outer seed coat on sand or gravel.

The pods can be eaten, but like many members of the genus Lathyrus they contain β-oxalyl-L-α,β-diaminopropionic acid, which can cause paralysis called lathyrism. The leaves of the plant are used in Chinese traditional medicine.
