= Cape lilac =

Cape lilac is a common name for several plants. It may refer to:

- Melia azedarach, native to China, India and Japan to Indonesia, Australia and the Pacific Islands, commonly known as "Cape Lilac" in Australia
- Virgilia, native to southern Africa and cultivated as an ornamental
