= Achyronia =

Achyronia may refer to:

- Achironia Steudel, a synonym of Aspalathus L.
- Achyronia Boehmer, a synonym of Aspalathus L.
- Achyronia O. Kuntze, a synonym of Aspalathus L.
- Achyronia Van Royen ex L., 1758, a synonym of Aspalathus L.
- Achyronia Wendl., 1798, a synonym of Liparia L.
