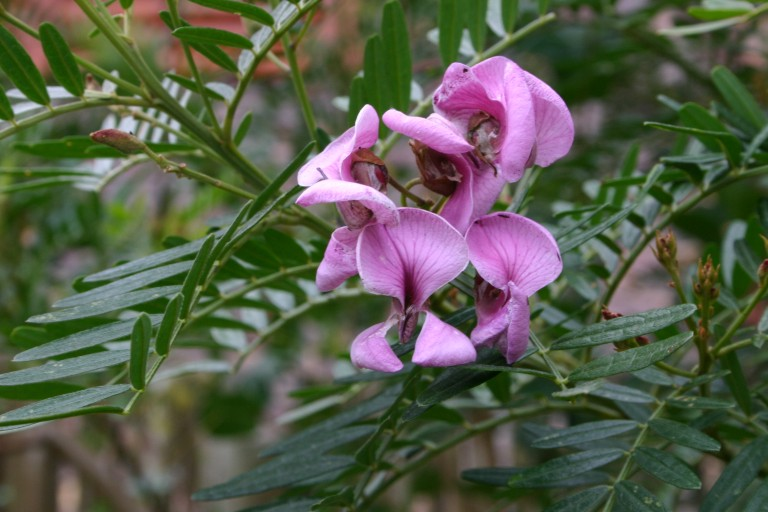
- Virgilia divaricata

Scientific classification
- Kingdom: Plantae
- Clade: Tracheophytes
- Clade: Angiosperms
- Clade: Eudicots
- Clade: Rosids
- Order: Fabales
- Family: Fabaceae
- Subfamily: Faboideae
- Clade: Meso-Papilionoideae
- Clade: Genistoids
- Clade: Core Genistoids
- Tribe: Podalyrieae (Benth.) Cardoso et al. 2013

Genera
- See text

Synonyms
- Genisteae subtribe Lipariinae (Benth.) Benth.; Liparieae (Benth.) Harv.; Liparieae subtribe Lipariinae (Benth.) Benth.; Loteae subtribe Lipariinae Benth.

= Podalyrieae =

Tribe of legumes

The tribe Podalyrieae is one of the subdivisions of the plant family Fabaceae.

== Description ==
The Podalyrieae arose 30.5 ± 2.6 million years ago (in the Oligocene) in the fynbos (Cape Floristic Region) of South Africa and is still mostly found there. All members of the tribe exhibit either nonsprouting or sprouting fire survival strategies. Many species are pollinated by insects, especially carpenter bees, while others are pollinated by sunbirds or rodents.

The members of this tribe consistently form a monophyletic clade in molecular phylogenetic analyses. The tribe does not currently have a node-based definition, but several morphological synapomorphies have been identified:

"imparipinnately compound leaves, axillary racemose inflorescences, carboxylic acid esters of quinolizidine alkaloids, and the isoflavone 3′-hydroxydaidzein as a major seed flavonoid" as well as "strongly reduced or absent bracteoles and the occurrence of persistent antipodals in the female gametophyte."

== Subtribes and genera ==
=== Subtribe Xiphothecinae ===
- Amphithalea Eckl. & Zeyh.
- Xiphotheca Eckl. & Zeyh.

=== Subtribe Podalyriinae ===
- Calpurnia E. Mey.
- Liparia L.
- Podalyria Willd.
- Stirtonanthus B.-E. van Wyk & A. L. Schutte
- Virgilia Poir.

=== Unassigned ===
- Cadia Forssk.
- Cyclopia Vent.
