= Podalyria argentea =

Podalyria argentea is a synonym for two species of flowering plants:

- Podalyria argentea (Salisb.) Salisb., a synonym of Podalyria racemulosa DC.
- Podalyria argentea (Siev.) Willd., a synonym of Ammodendron bifolium (Pall.) Yakovlev
