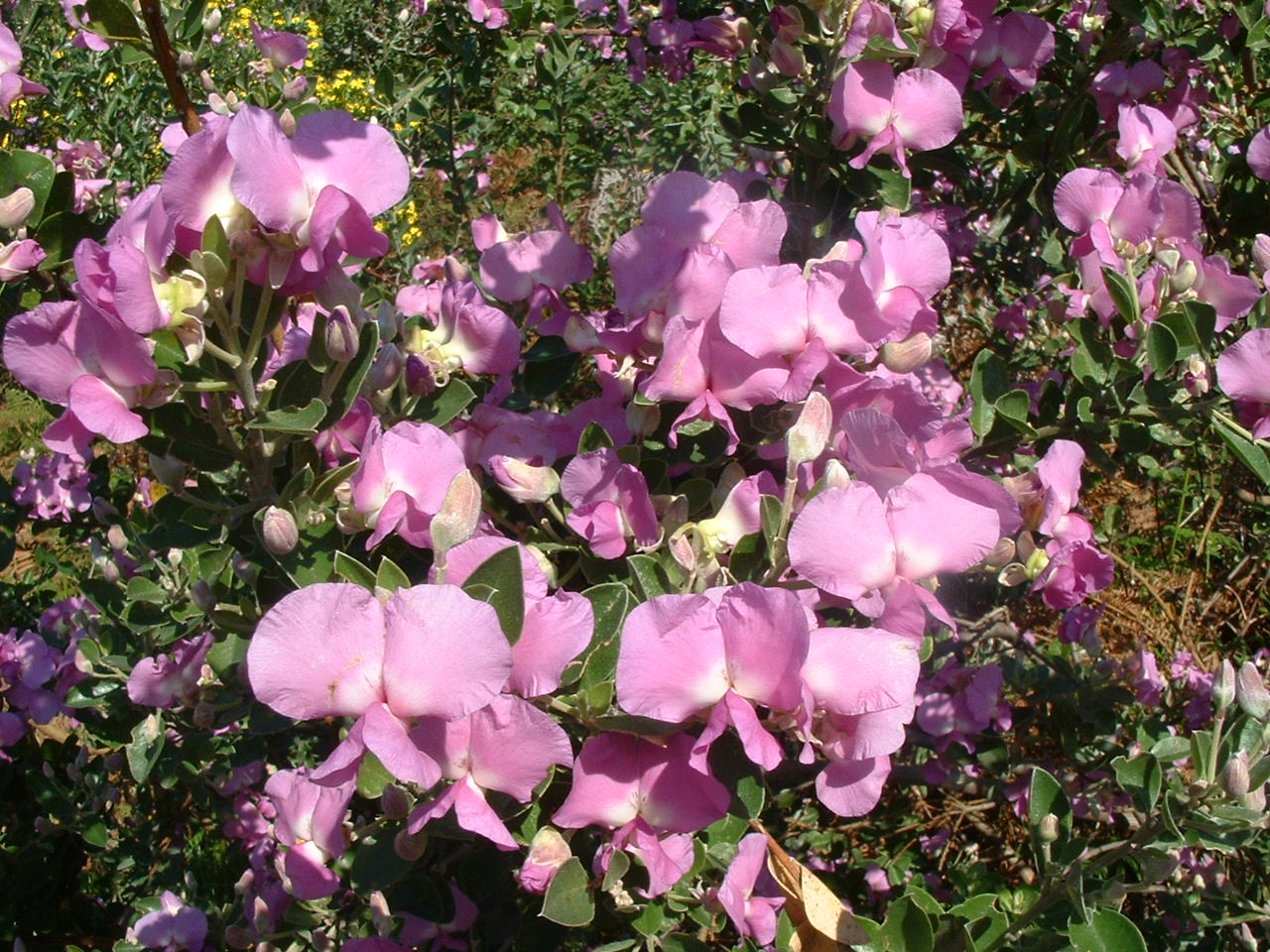

Scientific classification
- Kingdom: Plantae
- Clade: Tracheophytes
- Clade: Angiosperms
- Clade: Eudicots
- Clade: Rosids
- Order: Fabales
- Family: Fabaceae
- Subfamily: Faboideae
- Genus: Podalyria
- Species: P. calyptrata

Binomial name
- Podalyria calyptrata (Retz.) Willd. (1799)

Synonyms
- Aphora calyptrata (Retz.) Kuntze (1891); Crotalaria villosa L. (1753); Hypocalyptus calyptratus (Retz.) Thunb. (1800); Podalyria biflora var. angustifolia Walp. (1840); Podalyria calyptrata var. styracifolia (Sims) Walp. (1840); Podalyria styracifolia Sims (1813); Podalyria subbiflora DC. (1825); Sophora calyptrata Retz. (1779); Sophora calyptrata var. glabra P.J.Bergius (1767)

= Podalyria calyptrata =

Species of legume

Podalyria calyptrata (locally called keurtjie or water blossom pea) is a small, resilient, fast-growing tree of the Fabaceae (legume) family. It has velvety silver leaves, bears masses of bright-pink, sweetly scented flowers, and is indigenous to the Western Cape, South Africa.

== Description ==
Podalyria calyptrata is a small, tough, fast-growing tree around 4 meters in height. The simple, oval leaves are silvery grey and velvety in texture.

The bright-pink, strongly fragrant flowers are very striking and usually appear in spring (although flowering time varies). The flowers are very strongly fragrant, and their sweet scent can be smelled from afar. The seeds are contained in hard little pods that appear considerably later.

== Distribution and habitat ==
This tree occurs from Cape Town northwards as far as Tulbagh and eastwards across the Cape Fold mountains. It grows amongst fynbos and on the verges of forests.

== Cultivation ==
Once established, P. calyptrata tolerates wind, frost, and drought, but it is healthiest when it gets regular water and it does not grow well in highly salty or alkaline soils. Overall, it is very easy to grow. It makes a good informal hedge or screen along the edge of a property. It also makes a handsome specimen plant, with its bright flowers and attractive foliage. If planted in full sun and lightly pruned of young shoots, it becomes more bushy. If planted in the shade, it tends to become a taller tree, with less dense foliage.

Podalyria calyptrata can easily be propagated from seed. Allow the seeds to soak briefly in warm water before planting them.
