= Virgilia oroboides =

- Western Keurboom (Virgilia oroboides ssp. oroboides)

Conservation status
- Least Concern (IUCN 3.1)

Scientific classification
- Kingdom: Plantae
- Clade: Tracheophytes
- Clade: Angiosperms
- Clade: Eudicots
- Clade: Rosids
- Order: Fabales
- Family: Fabaceae
- Subfamily: Faboideae
- Genus: Virgilia (plant)
- Species: V. oroboides

Binomial name
- Virgilia oroboides (P.J.Bergius) T.M.Salter

Species of tree endemic to South Africa

Virgilia oroboides, also known as the Cape Virgilia, is a species of tree in the Keurboom genus which is endemic to South Africa.

== Range and habitat ==
Virgilia oroboides is found in the Western Cape, along the narrow strip of forested coastline from the Cape Peninsula to George.

== Taxonomy ==
There are two subspecies:

- Western keurboom (Virgilia oroboides ssp. oroboides)
- Eastern keurboom (Virgilia oroboides ssp. ferruginea)

== Gallery ==
Tree

Flowers

Pod

Leaves
