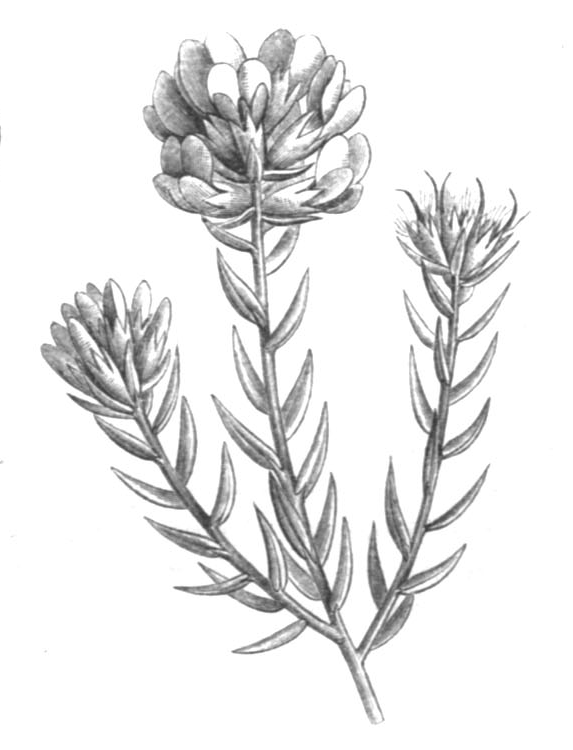
- Amphithalea ericifolia

Scientific classification
- Kingdom: Plantae
- Clade: Tracheophytes
- Clade: Angiosperms
- Clade: Eudicots
- Clade: Rosids
- Order: Fabales
- Family: Fabaceae
- Subfamily: Faboideae
- Tribe: Podalyrieae
- Genus: Amphithalea; Eckl. & Zeyh. (1836)

Species
- See text

Synonyms
- Coelidium Vogel ex Walp. (1840); Cryphianthia Eckl. and Zeyh. (1836); Epistemum Walp. (1840); Heudusa E.Mey. (1836); Ingenhoussia E.Mey. (1836); Lathriogyna Eckl. and Zeyh. (1836)

= Amphithalea =

Genus of legumes

Amphithalea is a genus of flowering plants in the family Fabaceae. It belongs to the subfamily Faboideae. It includes 41 species endemic to the Cape Provinces of South Africa.

== Species ==
Amphithalea comprises the following species:

- Amphithalea alba Granby
- Amphithalea axillaris Granby
- Amphithalea biovulata (Bolus) Granby
- Amphithalea bodkinii Dummer
- Amphithalea bowiei (Benth.) A. L. Schutte
- Amphithalea bullata (Benth.) A. L. Schutte
- Amphithalea cedarbergensis (Granby) A. L. Schutte
- Amphithalea ciliaris Eckl. & Zeyh.
- Amphithalea concava Granby
- Amphithalea cuneifolia Eckl. & Zeyh.
- Amphithalea cymbifolia (C. A. Sm.) A. L. Schutte
- Amphithalea dahlgrenii (Granby) A. L. Schutte
- Amphithalea ericifolia (L.) Eckl. & Zeyh.
- Amphithalea esterhuyseniae (Granby) A.L.Schutte
- Amphithalea flava (Granby) A.L.Schutte
- Amphithalea fourcadei Compton
- Amphithalea imbricata (L.) Druce
- Amphithalea intermedia Eckl. & Zeyh.
- Amphithalea micrantha (E. Mey.) Walp.
- Amphithalea minima (Granby) A.L.Schutte
- Amphithalea monticola A.L.Schutte
- Amphithalea muirii (Granby) A.L.Schutte
- Amphithalea muraltioides (Benth.) A.L.Schutte
- Amphithalea obtusiloba (Granby) A.L.Schutte
- Amphithalea oppositifolia L.Bolus
- Amphithalea ornata Boatwr. & J.C.Manning
- Amphithalea pageae (L. Bolus) A.L.Schutte
- Amphithalea perplexa Eckl. & Zeyh.
- Amphithalea phylicoides Eckl. & Zeyh.
- Amphithalea purpurea (Granby) A.L.Schutte
- Amphithalea rostrata A.L.Schutte & B.-E.van Wyk
- Amphithalea sericea Schltr.
- Amphithalea speciosa Schltr.
- Amphithalea spinosa A.L.Schutte (unplaced)
- Amphithalea stokoei L. Bolus
- Amphithalea tomentosa (Thunb.) Granby
- Amphithalea tortilis (E. Mey.) Steud.
- Amphithalea villosa Schltr.
- Amphithalea violacea (E. Mey.) Benth.
- Amphithalea virgata Eckl. & Zeyh.
- Amphithalea vlokii (A.L.Schutte & B.-E.van Wyk) A.L.Schutte
- Amphithalea williamsonii Harv.

=== Formerly placed here ===
- Coelidium fourcadei (as Amphithalea parvifolia)
