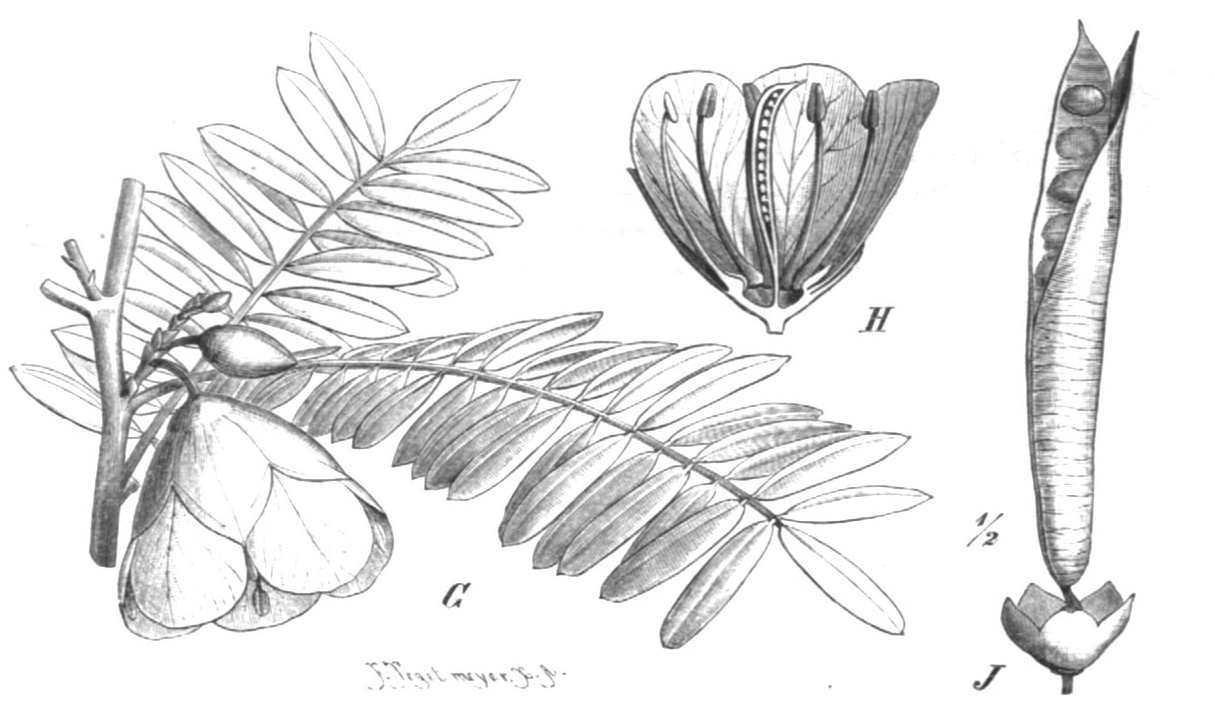
- Cadia purpurea

Scientific classification
- Kingdom: Plantae
- Clade: Tracheophytes
- Clade: Angiosperms
- Clade: Eudicots
- Clade: Rosids
- Order: Fabales
- Family: Fabaceae
- Subfamily: Faboideae
- Tribe: Podalyrieae
- Genus: Cadia; Forssk. (1775)

Species
- Cadia commersoniana Baill.; Cadia ellisiana Baker; Cadia emarginatior M.Peltier; Cadia multifoliolata Nusb. & Labat; Cadia pedicellata Baker; Cadia pubescens Bojer ex Baker; Cadia purpurea (G. Piccioli) Aiton; Cadia rubra R.Vig.

Synonyms
- Panciatica G.Piccioli (1783); Spaendoncea Desf. (1796)

= Cadia (plant) =

Genus of legumes

Cadia is a genus of flowering plants in the family Fabaceae which belongs to the subfamily Faboideae. It includes 8 species native to northeastern Africa, the Arabian Peninsula, and Madagascar.

Unlike most plants in the Faboideae, it has radially symmetrical flowers. In related species with bilateral symmetry, such as those of Lupinus, the dorsal (upper or adaxial) part of the flower expresses one or more genes in the Cycloidea (CYC)/Dichotoma (DICH) family. In Cadia, these genes are expressed throughout the flower. Thus, from a molecular point of view, Cadia is not reversing the ancestral evolution from radial symmetry to bilateral symmetry but obtaining radial symmetry from a new mechanism.

Eight species are accepted:

- Cadia commersoniana Baill. – southwestern Madagascar
- Cadia ellisiana Baker – east-central and eastern Madagascar
- Cadia emarginatior M.Peltier – western Madagascar (Boina Region)
- Cadia multifoliolata Nusb. & Labat – Madagascar
- Cadia pedicellata Baker – central Madagascar
- Cadia pubescens Bojer ex Baker – central and east-central Madagascar
- Cadia purpurea (G. Piccioli) Aiton – Horn of Africa (Ethiopia, Eritrea, and Somalia), Kenya, and Arabian Peninsula (Oman, Saudi Arabia, and Yemen)
- Cadia rubra R.Vig. – western Madagascar (Ankara Plateau)
