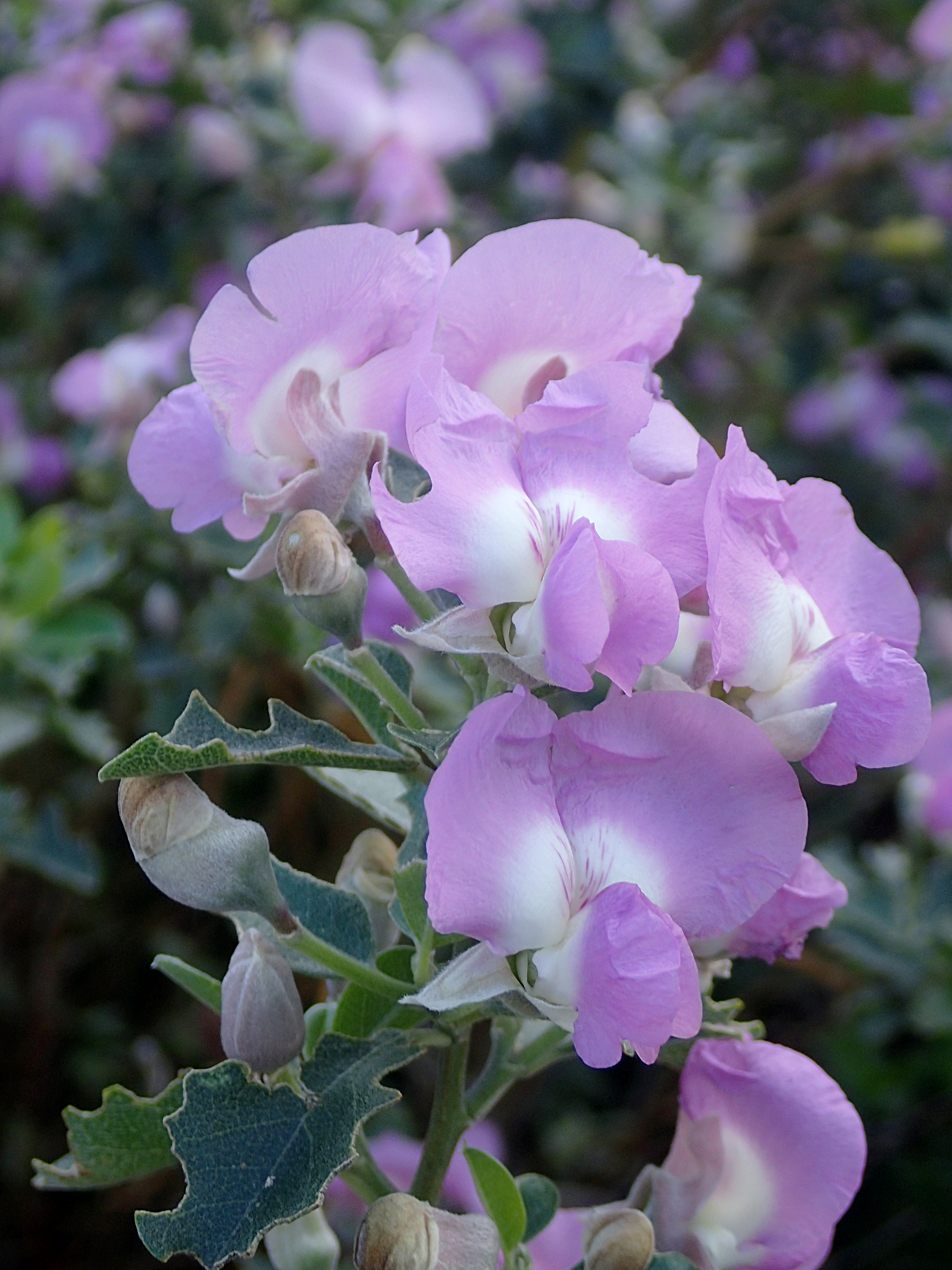
- Podalyria calyptrata

Scientific classification
- Kingdom: Plantae
- Clade: Tracheophytes
- Clade: Angiosperms
- Clade: Eudicots
- Clade: Rosids
- Order: Fabales
- Family: Fabaceae
- Subfamily: Faboideae
- Tribe: Podalyrieae
- Genus: Podalyria; Willd. (1799), nom. cons.

Species
- 17; see text

Synonyms
- Aphora Neck. ex Kuntze (1891), nom. superfl.

= Podalyria =

Genus of legumes

Podalyria is a genus of flowering plants in the family Fabaceae. It includes 17 species of small trees or shrubs native to the Cape Provinces, Free State, and KwaZulu-Natal in South Africa. They inhabit Mediterranean-climate shrubland (fynbos and forest margins) from low to high elevations, typically in rocky or sandy areas. It belongs to the subfamily Faboideae. The genus is endemic to South Africa.

== Species ==
Podalyria comprises the following species:

- Podalyria amoena Eckl. & Zeyh.
- Podalyria biflora (L.) Lam.
- Podalyria burchellii DC.
- Podalyria buxifolia Willd.
- Podalyria calyptrata (Retz.) Willd.
- Podalyria cordata R.Br.
- Podalyria hirsuta (Aiton) Willd.
- Podalyria lanceolata (E.Mey.) Benth.
- Podalyria leipoldtii L.Bolus ex A.L.Schutte
- Podalyria microphylla E.Mey.
- Podalyria myrtillifolia (Retz.) Willd.
- Podalyria oleifolia Salisb.
- Podalyria orbicularis (E.Mey.) Eckl. & Zeyh.
- Podalyria pearsonii E.Phillips
- Podalyria racemulosa DC.
- Podalyria sericea (Andrews) R.Br.
- Podalyria variabilis A.L.Schutte
