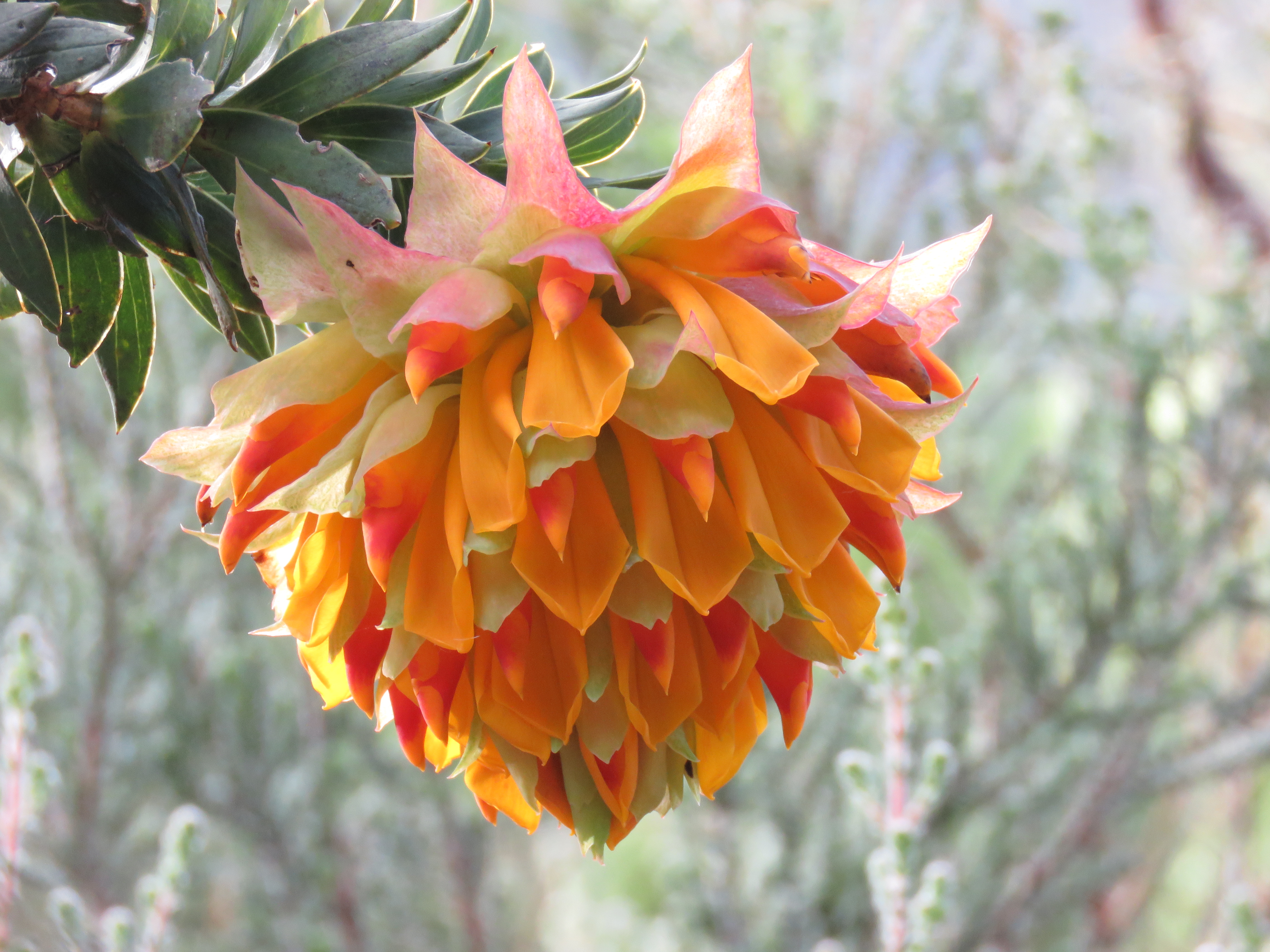

Scientific classification
- Kingdom: Plantae
- Clade: Tracheophytes
- Clade: Angiosperms
- Clade: Eudicots
- Clade: Rosids
- Order: Fabales
- Family: Fabaceae
- Subfamily: Faboideae
- Genus: Liparia
- Species: L. splendens

Binomial name
- Liparia splendens Burm.f.

Subspecies
- Liparia splendens subsp. comantha (Eckl. & Zeyh.) Bos & de Wit; Liparia splendens subsp. splendens (Burm. f.) Bos & de Wit
- Liparia splendens is endemic to the fynbos of South Africa.: Liparia splendens subsp. comantha.; Liparia splendens subsp. splendens.

= Liparia splendens =

Species of legume

Liparia splendens (locally called orange nodding-head or mountain dahlia; “Skaamblom” (Shy flower) in Afrikaans) is a flowering fynbos shrub of the Fabaceae (legume) family, that occurs in the South-western Cape of South Africa.

== Description ==
In spite of its common name, this plant is in fact unrelated to Dahlia, and is part of the legume family.

This multi-branching, re-sprouting, flowering shrub reaches about 1 metre in height. The flowers ("nodding heads") appear from autumn until summer. The flower heads each comprise over 15 individual flowers and are orange-yellow in colour.

The flowers resemble those of Protea, as they have adapted to the same pollinator, the sunbird.

The plant can survive the frequent fynbos fires as it has a large, strong underground root-stock from which it resprouts. However it can be challenging to grow in cultivation unless its needs are met, which are moderate temperatures and humidity, and well-draining soil.

== Distribution ==
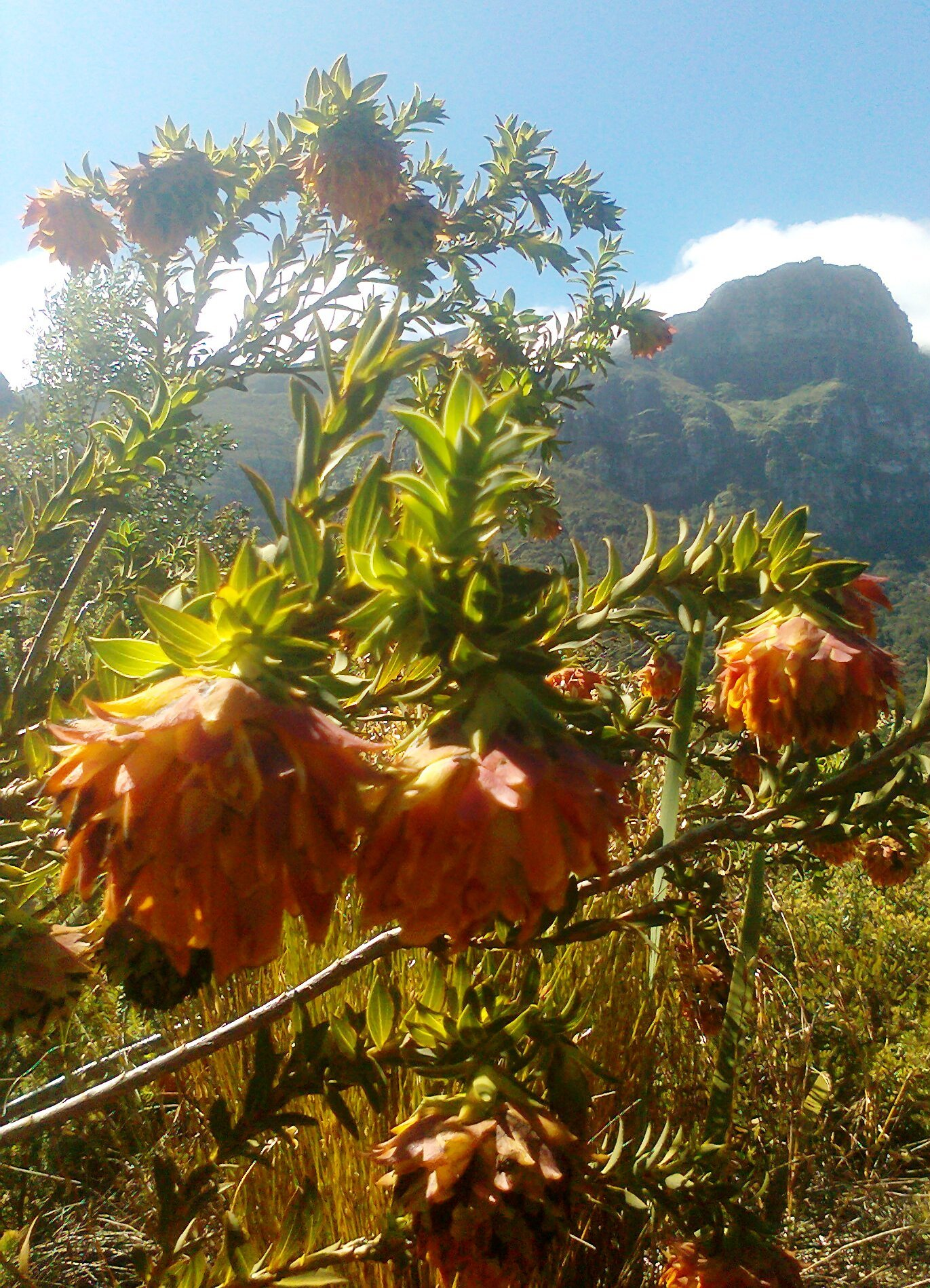
Liparia splendens in typical habitat.

Classed as Vulnerable on the IUCN global Red List, this plant is found in mountain and lowland fynbos in the Western Cape, South Africa. Here it is found from the Cape Peninsula in the west, as far east as Albertinia and Riversdale.

It has two main subspecies, splendens around the Cape Peninsula, and subsp. comantha further east.
