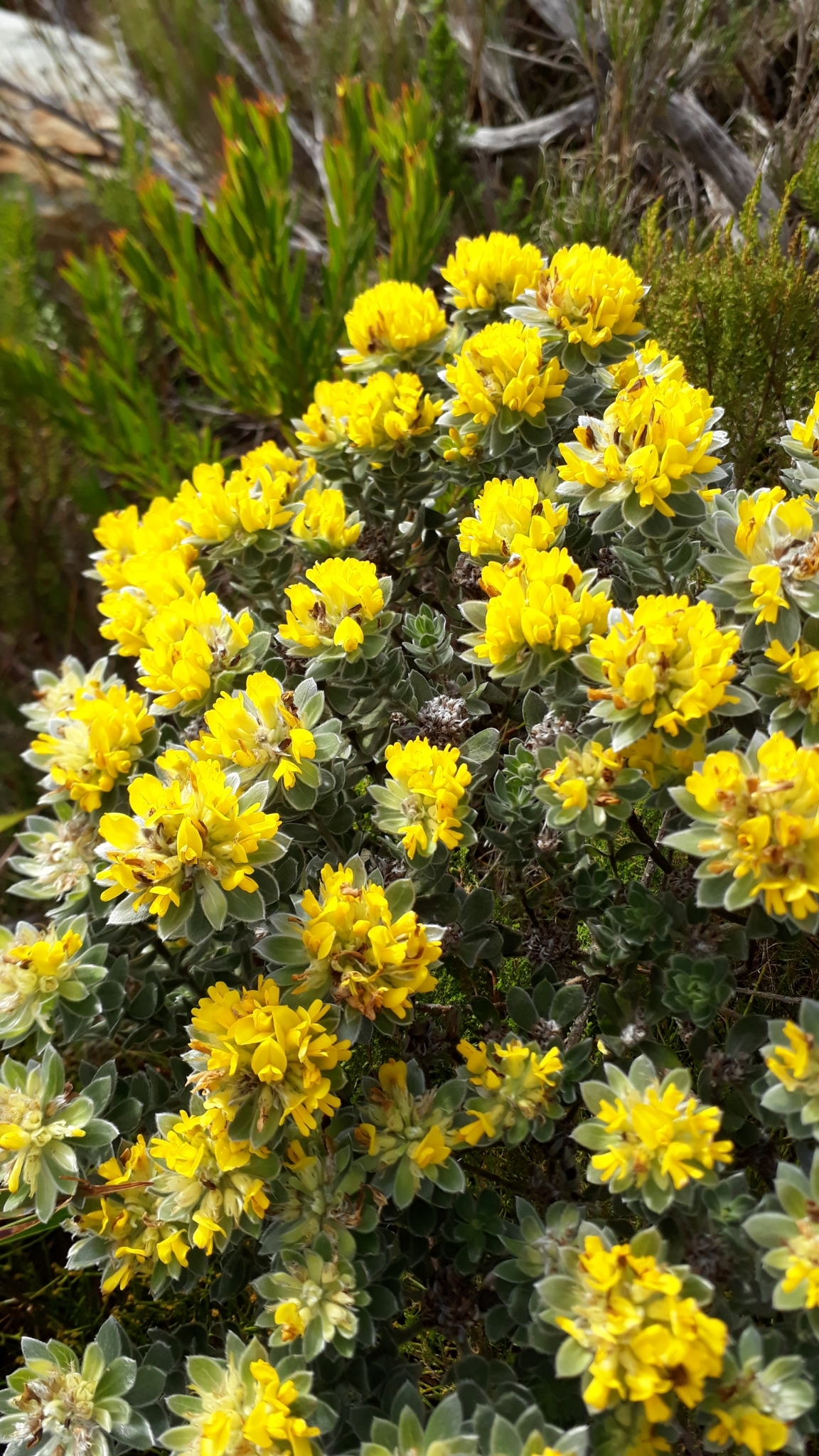
- Xiphotheca fruticosa

Scientific classification
- Kingdom: Plantae
- Clade: Tracheophytes
- Clade: Angiosperms
- Clade: Eudicots
- Clade: Rosids
- Order: Fabales
- Family: Fabaceae
- Subfamily: Faboideae
- Tribe: Podalyrieae
- Genus: Xiphotheca; Eckl. & Zeyh. (1836)

Species
- See text.
- Xiphotheca is endemic to the fynbos of South Africa.: Range of section Congestae; Range of section Xiphotheca

Synonyms
- Priestleya sect. Aneisothea DC.

= Xiphotheca =

Genus of legumes

Xiphotheca is a genus of flowering plants in the legume family, Fabaceae. It includes 10 species of shrubs endemic to the Cape Provinces of South Africa. They grow in fynbos (Mediterranean-climate shrubland), generally at medium or low elevations, and often species have highly localised ranges. The genus belongs to the subfamily Faboideae. The name of the genus is a compound of Ancient Greek ξίφος (ksíphos), which means "sword", and θήκη (thēkē) which can mean "box" or "sheath"—a reference to the shape of the legume pods. Members of this genus can be distinguished by:

"(1) the presence of bracteoles in most species; (2) the fusion of the bracts with the base of the pedicel; (3) the laterally compressed pods; and (4) the accumulation of anabasine as a major alkaloid."

== Species ==
Xiphotheca comprises the following species:

=== Section Congestae ===
- Xiphotheca fruticosa (L.) A. L. Schutte & B.-E. van Wyk
- Xiphotheca guthriei (L. Bolus) A. L. Schutte & B.-E. van Wyk
- Xiphotheca lanceolata (E. Mey.) Eckl. & Zeyh.
- Xiphotheca reflexa (Thunb.) A. L. Schutte & B.-E. van Wyk

=== Section Xiphotheca ===
- Xiphotheca canescens (Thunb.) A. L. Schutte & B.-E. van Wyk
- Xiphotheca cordifolia A. L. Schutte & B.-E. van Wyk
- Xiphotheca elliptica (DC.) A. L. Schutte & B.-E. van Wyk
- Xiphotheca phylicoides A. L. Schutte & B.-E. van Wyk
- Xiphotheca tecta (Thunb.) A. L. Schutte & B.-E. van Wyk
