= Virgilia divaricata =

Conservation status
- Least Concern (IUCN 3.1)

Scientific classification
- Kingdom: Plantae
- Clade: Tracheophytes
- Clade: Angiosperms
- Clade: Eudicots
- Clade: Rosids
- Order: Fabales
- Family: Fabaceae
- Subfamily: Faboideae
- Genus: Virgilia (plant)
- Species: V. divaricata

Binomial name
- Virgilia divaricata Adamson

Species of tree endemic to South Africa

Virgilia divaricata, also known as the Gardenroute keurboom or pink keurboom, is a species of tree that is endemic to South Africa.

== Range and habitat ==
Virgilia divaricata is found in the forested fynbos margins of the Western Cape, from the Outeniqua mountains near George to Grahamstown.

== Gallery ==
Leaves

Pod
