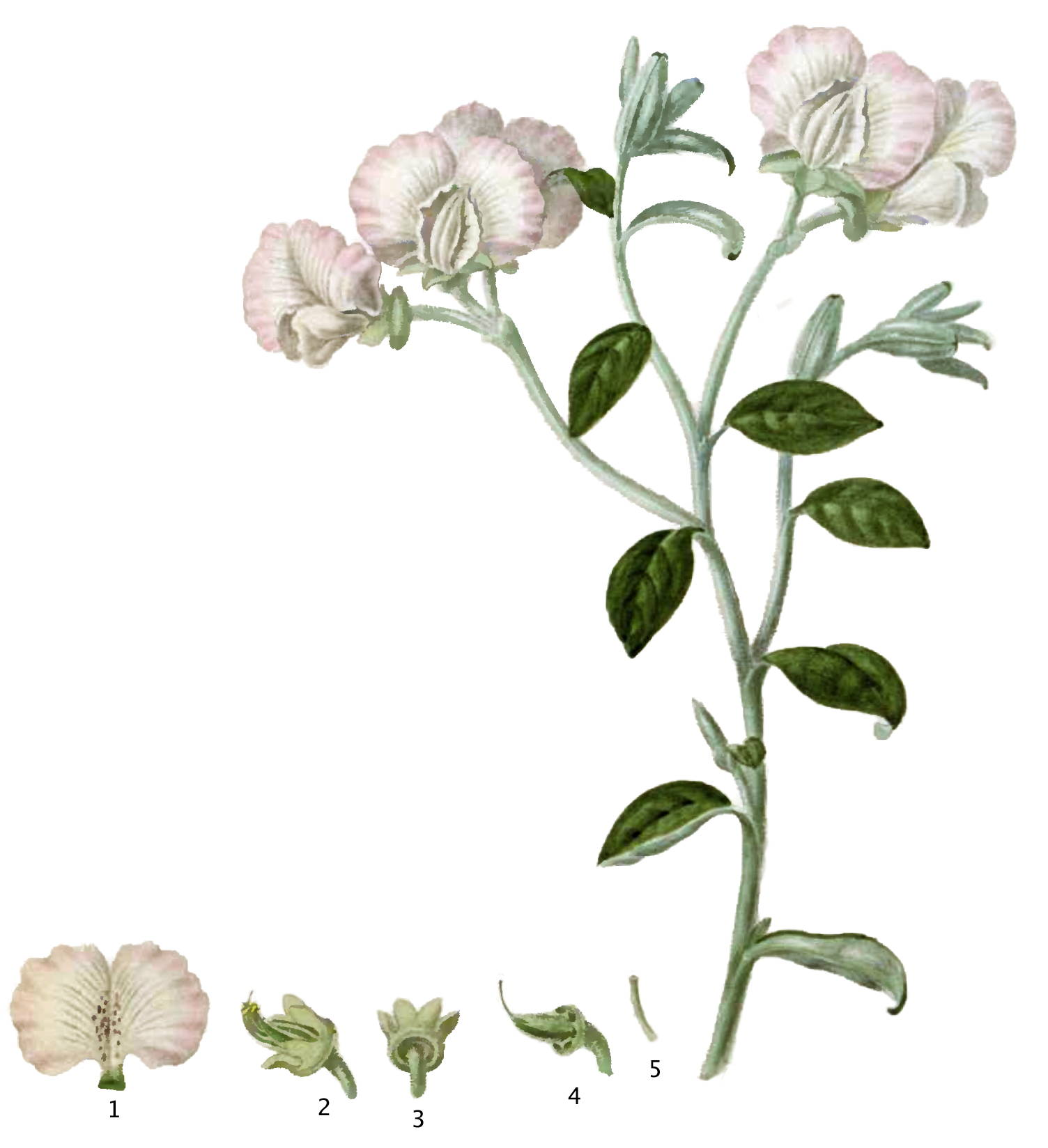
- Illustration from The Paradisus Londinensis

Scientific classification
- Kingdom: Plantae
- Clade: Tracheophytes
- Clade: Angiosperms
- Clade: Eudicots
- Clade: Rosids
- Order: Fabales
- Family: Fabaceae
- Subfamily: Faboideae
- Genus: Podalyria
- Species: P. racemulosa

Binomial name
- Podalyria racemulosa DC.

Synonyms
- Aphora argentea (Salisb.) Kuntze; Podalyria angustifolia (E.Mey.) Eckl. & Zeyh.; Podalyria argentea (Salisb.) Salisb., nom. illeg.; Podalyria argentea var. angustifolia E.Mey.; Podalyria argentea var. glabrata Walp.; Podalyria argentea var. racemulosa (DC.) Walp.; Sophora argentea Salisb.

= Podalyria racemulosa =

Species of legume

Podalyria argentea is a species of flowering plant in the legume family (Fabaceae or Leguminosae), native to the southwestern Cape Provinces of South Africa.

The synonym Podalyria argentea (Salisb.) Salisb. should not be confused with Podalyria argentea W(Siev.) Willd., which is a synonym for a quite different species, Ammodendron bifolium, from Russia and Xinjiang, China.
