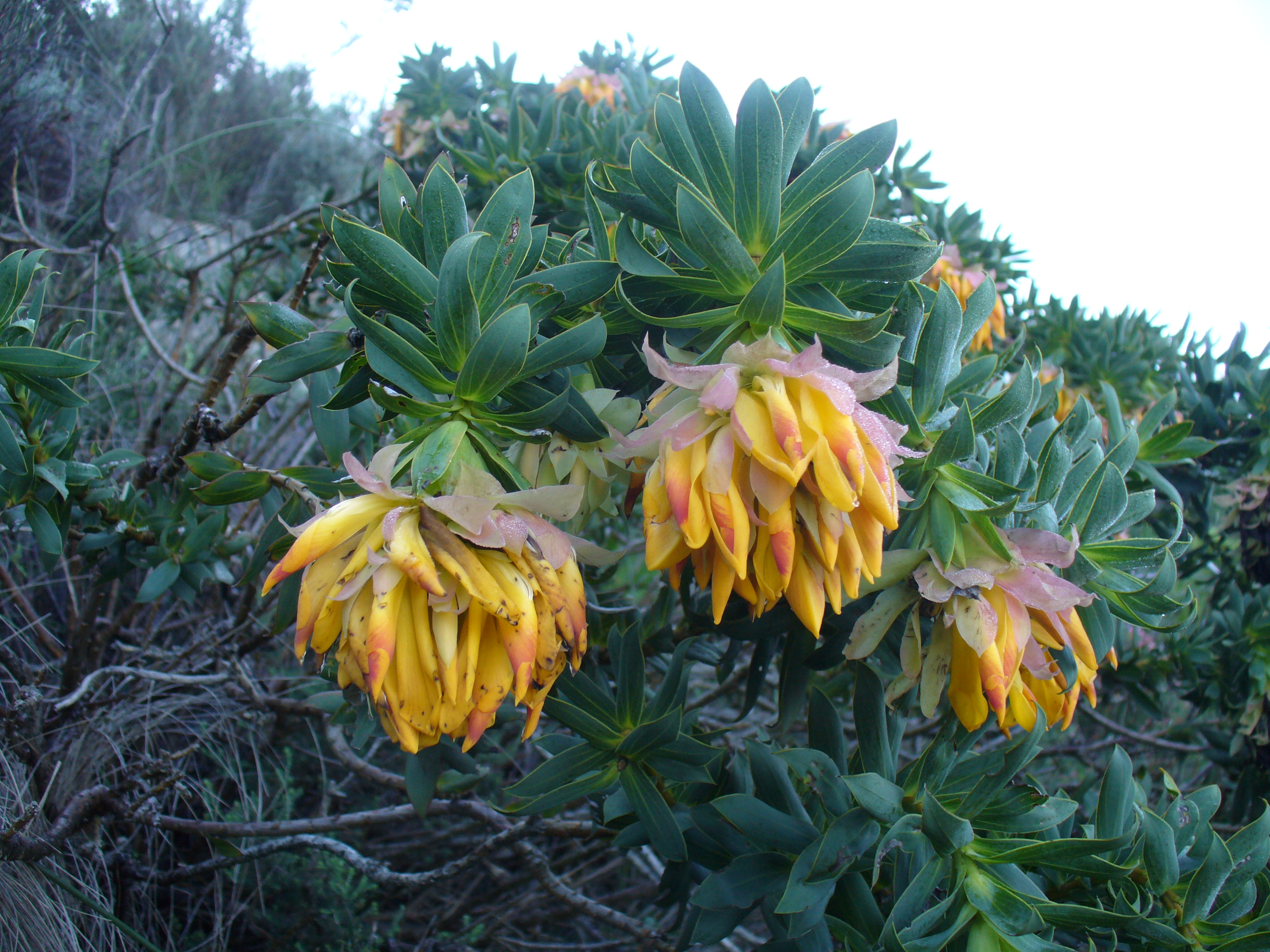
- Liparia splendens

Scientific classification
- Kingdom: Plantae
- Clade: Tracheophytes
- Clade: Angiosperms
- Clade: Eudicots
- Clade: Rosids
- Order: Fabales
- Family: Fabaceae
- Subfamily: Faboideae
- Tribe: Podalyrieae
- Genus: Liparia; L. (1771)

Sections and species
- See text
- Liparia is endemic to South Africa.: Range of section Decussatae.; Range of section Liparia.

Synonyms
- Achyronia J.C.Wendl. (1798), nom. illeg.; Priestleya DC. (1824 publ. 1825); Priestleya sect. Eisothea DC.

= Liparia (plant) =

Genus of legumes

Liparia is a genus of flowering plants in the legume family, Fabaceae. It includes 20 species native to the Cape Provinces of South Africa. It belongs to the subfamily Faboideae.

== Species ==
Liparia comprises the following species:

=== Section Decussatae ===
- Liparia bonaespei A. L. Schutte
- Liparia boucheri E. G. H. Oliv. & Fellingham) A. L. Schutte
- Liparia calycina (L. Bolus) A. L. Schutte
- Liparia capitata Thunb.
- Liparia congesta A. L. Schutte
- Liparia laevigata (L.) Thunb.
- Liparia latifolia (Benth.) A. L. Schutte
- Liparia myrtifolia Thunb.
- Liparia rafnioides A. L. Schutte
- Liparia umbellifera Thunb.
- Liparia vestita Thunb.

=== Section Liparia ===
- Liparia angustifolia (Eckl. & Zeyh.) A. L. Schutte
- Liparia confusa A. L. Schutte
- Liparia genistoides (Lam.) A. L. Schutte
- †Liparia graminifolia L.
- Liparia hirsuta Thunb.
- Liparia parva Vogel ex Walp.
- Liparia racemosa A. L. Schutte
- Liparia splendens (Burm. f.) Bos & de Wit
  - subsp. comantha (Eckl. & Zeyh.) Bos & de Wit
  - subsp. splendens (Burm. f.) Bos & de Wit
- Liparia striata A. L. Schutte
