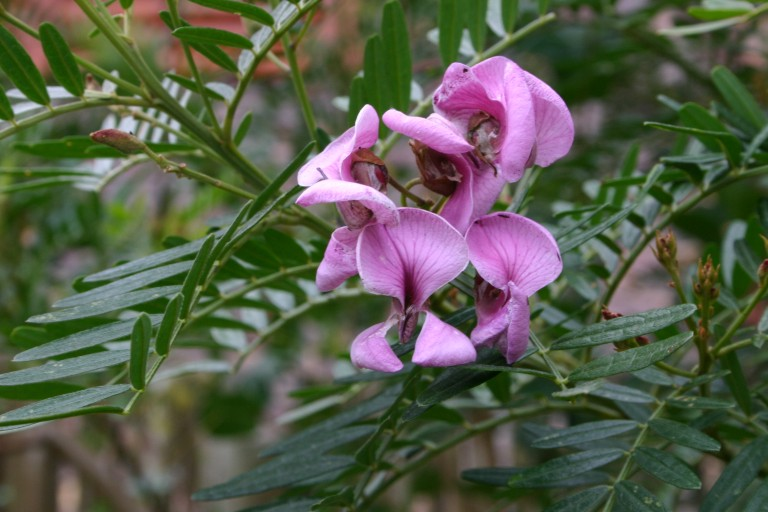
- Virgilia divaricata

Scientific classification
- Kingdom: Plantae
- Clade: Tracheophytes
- Clade: Angiosperms
- Clade: Eudicots
- Clade: Rosids
- Order: Fabales
- Family: Fabaceae
- Subfamily: Faboideae
- Tribe: Podalyrieae
- Genus: Virgilia; Lam. (1793), nom. cons.

Species
- Virgilia divaricata Adamson; Virgilia oroboides (P.J.Bergius) T.M.Salter

Synonyms
- Andrastis Raf. ex Benth. (1837)

= Virgilia (plant) =

Genus of legumes

Virgilia is a genus of Southern African trees in the family Fabaceae that is known for its very fast growth (4.5 m in 2 years) and a tendency to fall over as it matures (15 years or so). The common name in South Africa (in Afrikaans) is keurboom, meaning 'choice tree'. Valued as useful ornamental trees by gardeners, the genus's two species are also known as tree-in-a-hurry, Cape lilac, blossom tree and pink blossom tree.

== Taxonomy ==
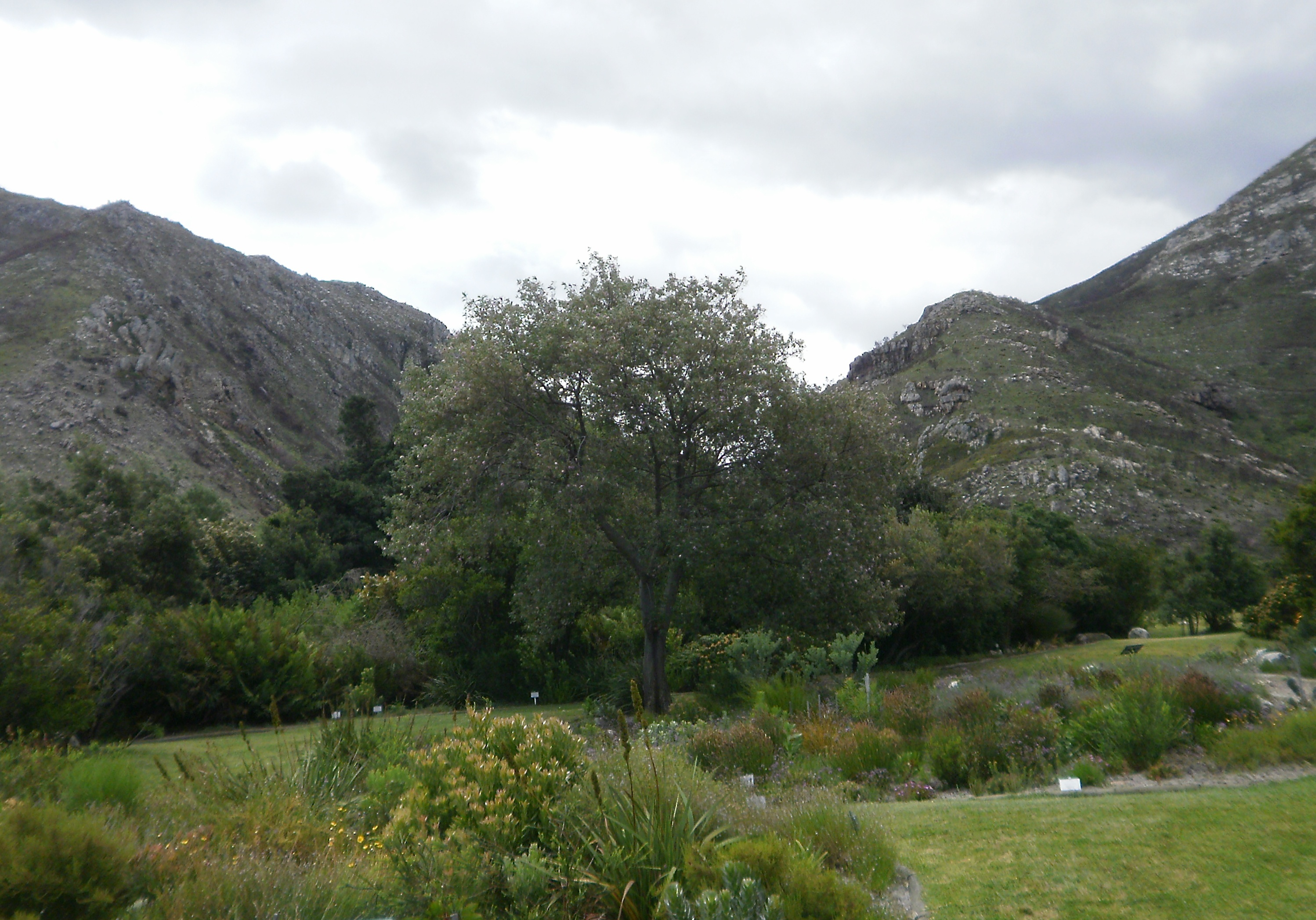
A mature tree in South Africa.

The genus was described by Jean Louis Marie Poiret and published in Encyclopédie Méthodique in 1808. Most botanists feel that the two species are simply forms and should be lumped under one species, Virgilia oroboides. That would mean that the current V. divaricata is simply a darker form limited to the forested region of Knysna, South Africa. Virgilia oroboides had a number of synonyms, while both V. oroboides and V. divaricata had both been named V. capensis by different authors.

=== Species ===
Below is a list of offers species of the genus Virgilia accepted as of July 2014, sorted alphabetically. For each one, the binomial name followed by the author is indicated, abbreviated according to the conventions and uses.

- Virgilia divaricata Adamson
- Virgilia oroboides (P.J.Bergius) T.M.Salter

== Description ==
These are small to medium sized trees, up to 15 to 20 meters tall, filling space easily in the garden. The tree has shiny green, fern-like, pinnate foliage and displays attractive pea-like, mauve/pink, fragrant flowers (which smell like bubblegum) during warmer months that will be followed by dark, leathery seed pods.

== Cultivation ==
Growing in full sun to partially shade, they prefer well drained soils; some will then grow 2m in the first season. They will tolerate wind and have dense foliage growing close to the ground, so they are useful as pioneer species for privacy and wind protection, despite having a comparatively short life (15 years). Popular in the UK since the 18th century or so, they are also now commonly present in the USA and Australia.

== Gallery ==
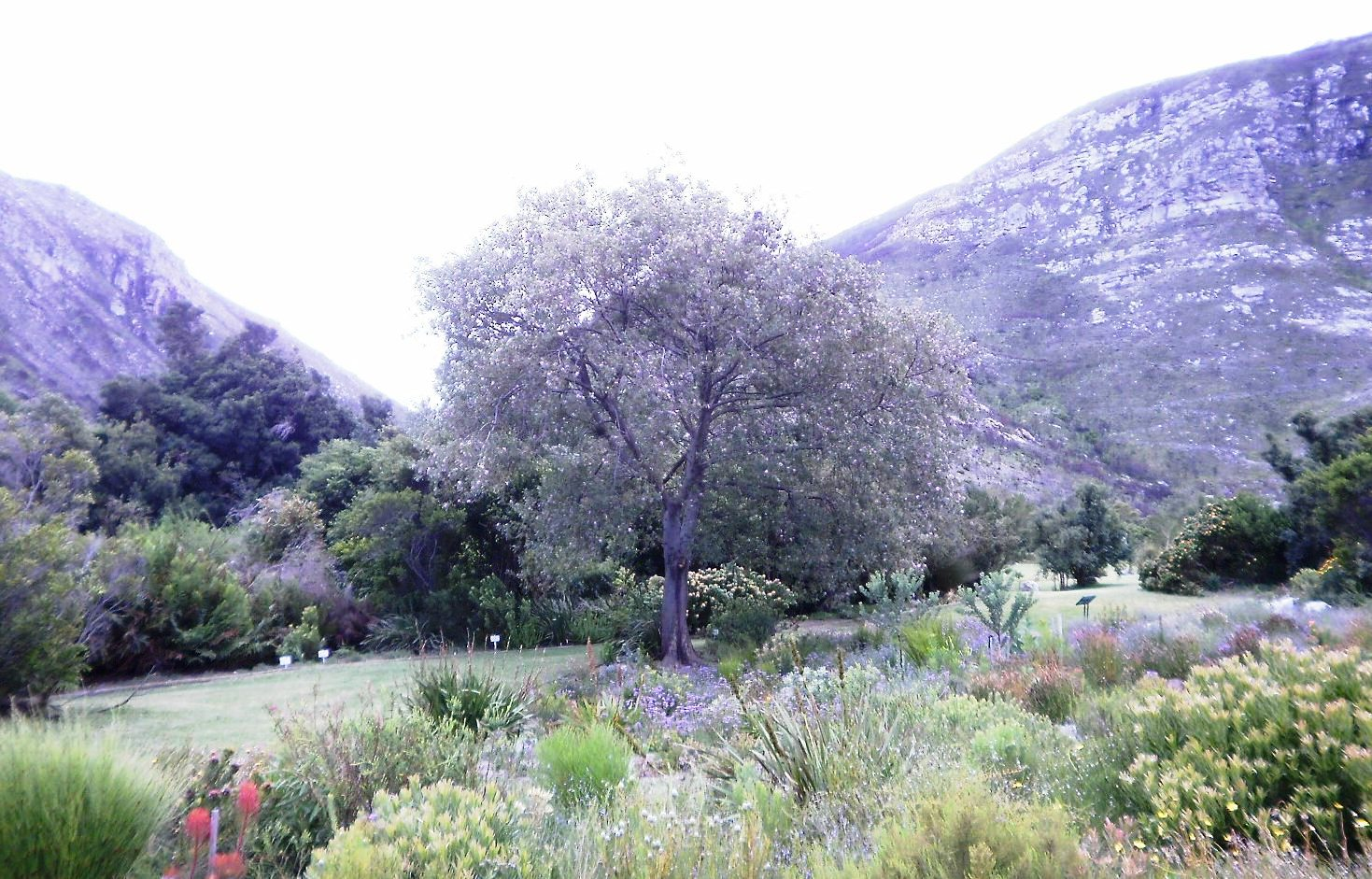
A mature tree blooming in South Africa

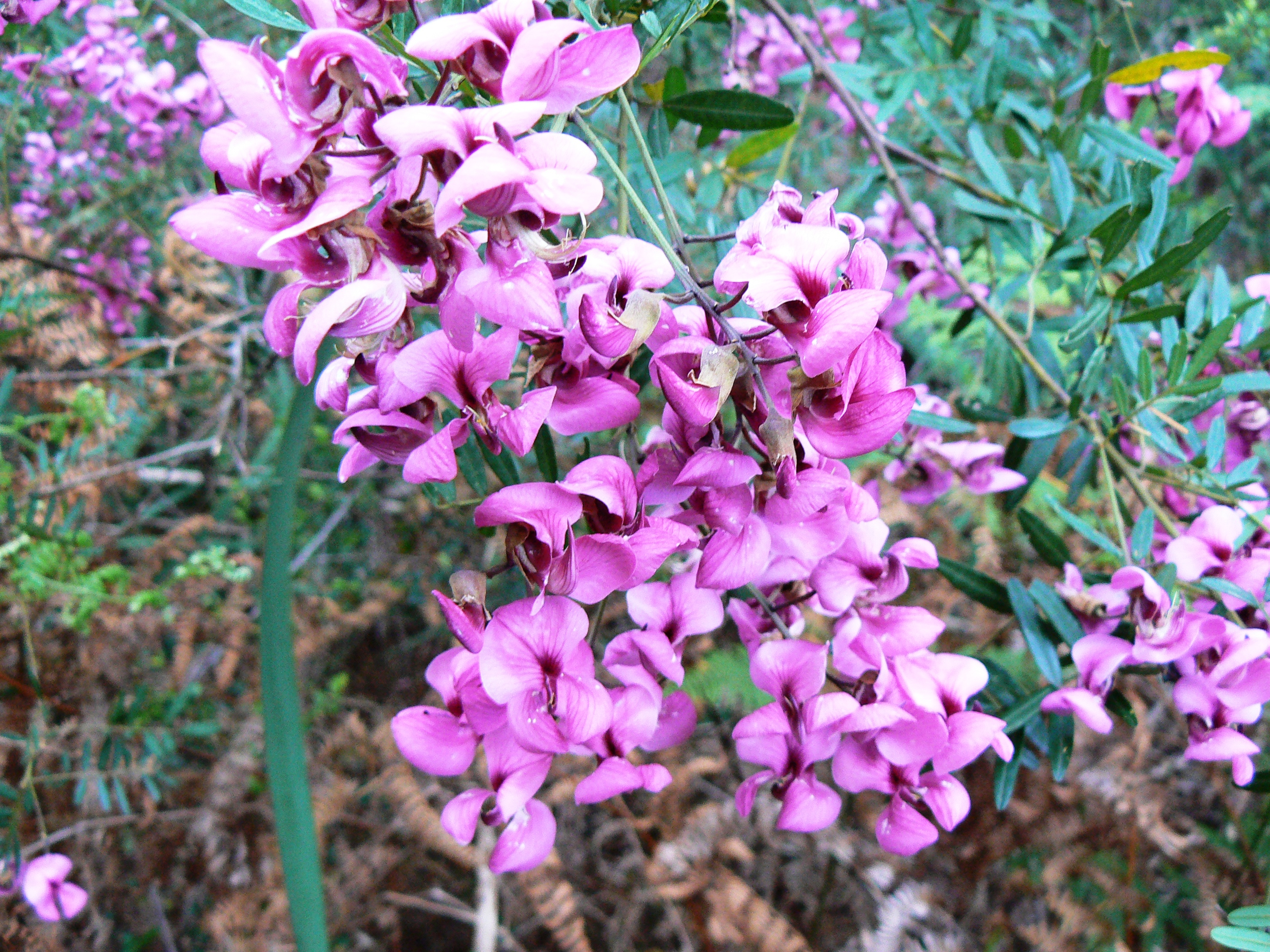
Close up of flowers in Cape Town

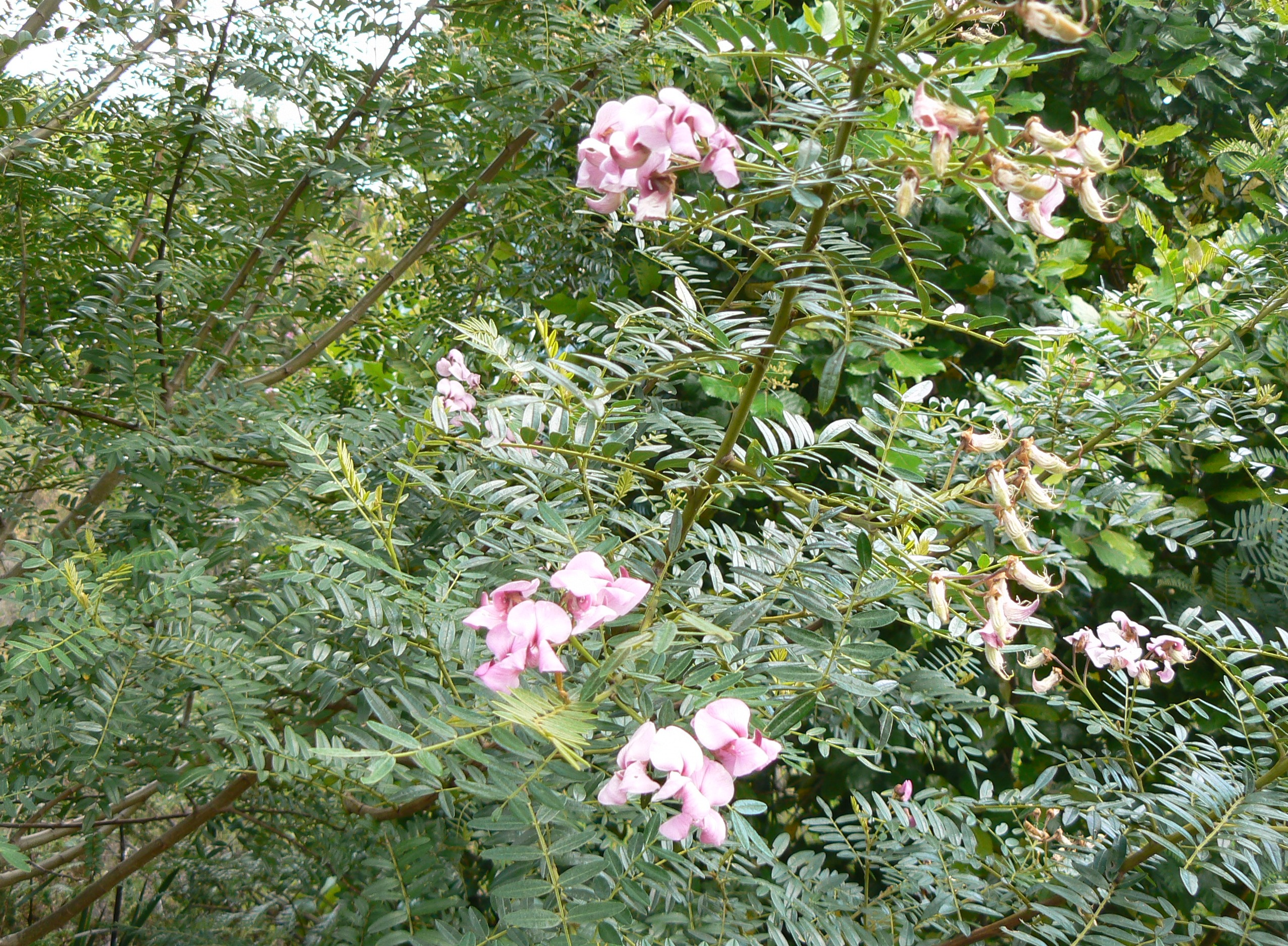
Leaf shape

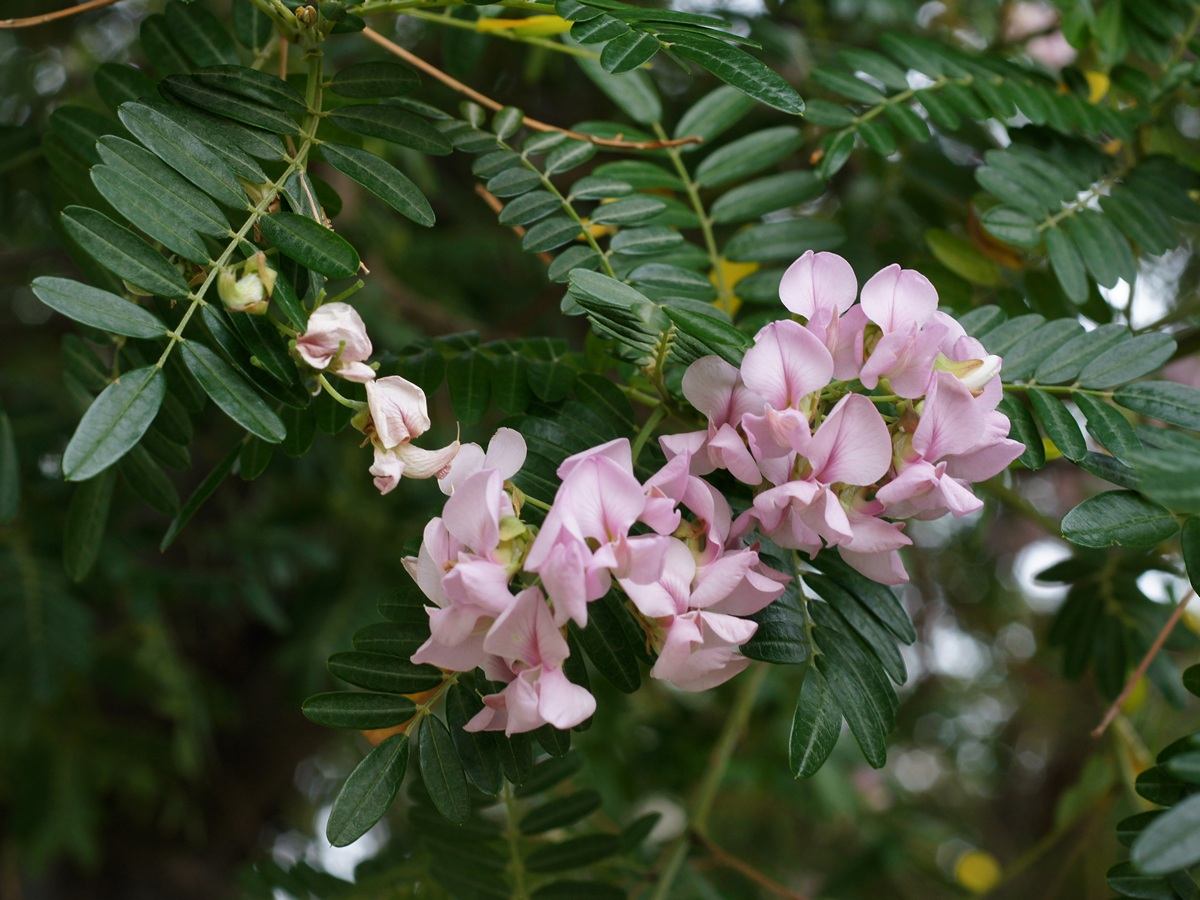
A flowering tree in Perth

== See also ==
- Virgilia is the larval food plant of the moth Leto venus.
