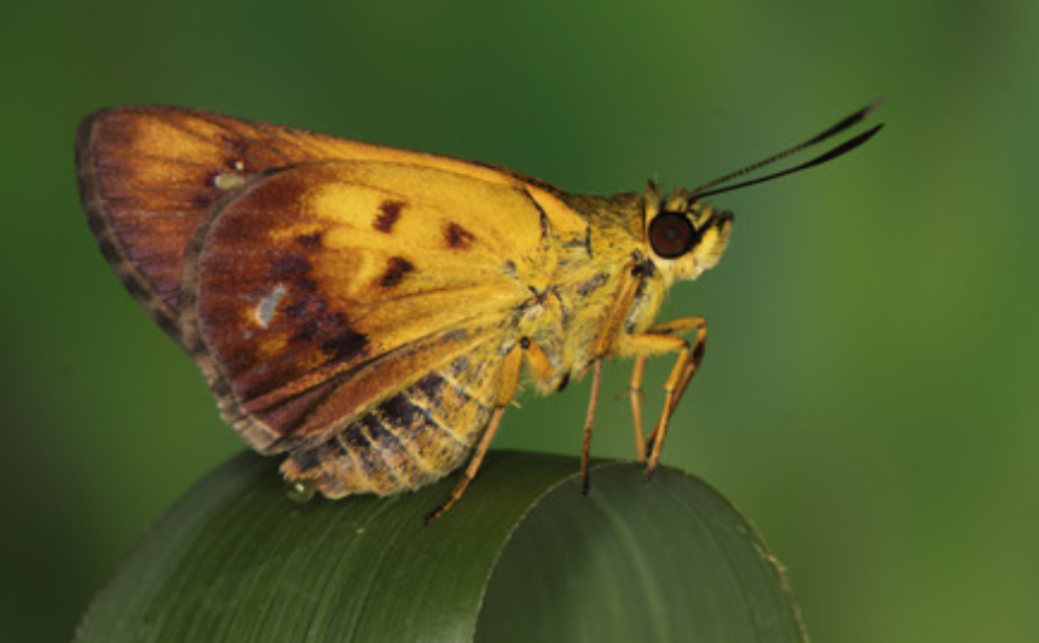

Scientific classification
- Kingdom: Animalia
- Phylum: Arthropoda
- Clade: Pancrustacea
- Class: Insecta
- Order: Lepidoptera
- Family: Hesperiidae
- Genus: Zographetus
- Species: Z. mathewi

Binomial name
- Zographetus mathewi Sadasivan et al., 2025

= Zographetus mathewi =

Species of butterfly

Zographetus mathewi, also known as the Sahyadri spotted flitter, is a butterfly in the family Hesperiidae. It is found in Kerala in India. It was described by Kalesh Sadasivan and others in 2025. This species is monotypic.

== Etymology ==
This species was named after Indian lepidopterologist George Mathew.

== Description ==
The upperside forewing of the male is dark chocolate brown with several spots while the upperside hindwing is unspotted and has long brownish-green hairs.

The underside forewing is bright ochreous yellow, with most spots similar to those in the upperside forewing. The underside hindwing is similar to the forewing but it has a post discal series of purple spots from spaces 1b to 6.

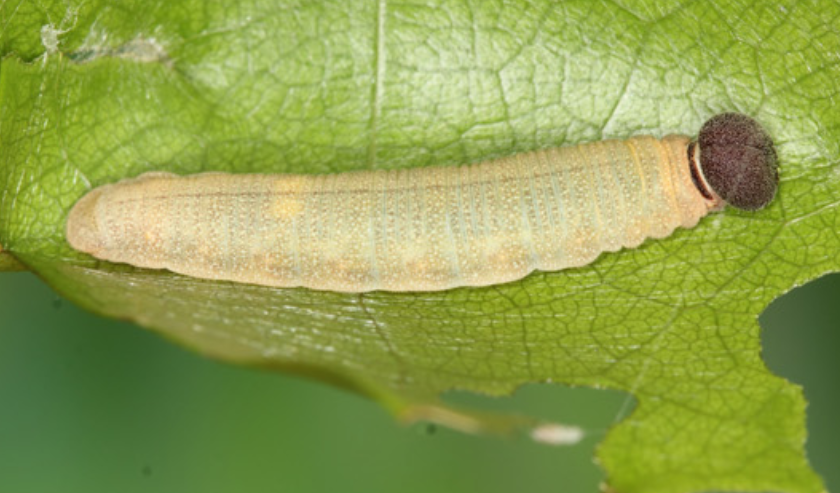
Final instar caterpillar

The female is very similar to the male in appearance. This species is separated from many similar species by the swollen forewing veins in the males, forewing spots and genitalia.

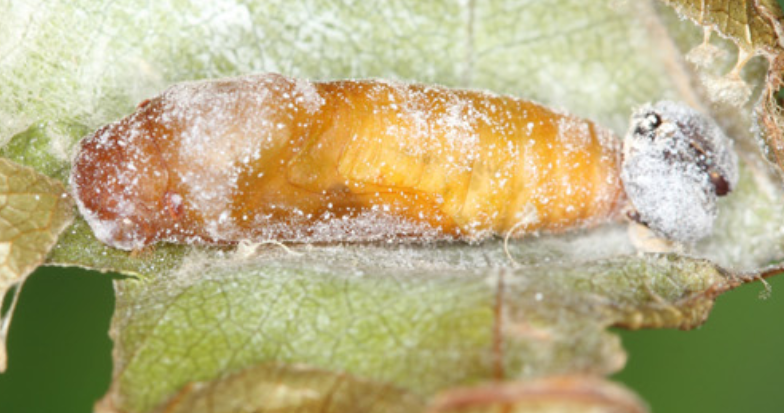
Pupa

== Life cycle ==
The larvae of this species have been known to feed on the leaves of Aganope thyrsiflora. The duration of the larval stage is around 21 to 26 days and the pupal stage takes about 10 to 11 days.

== Distribution ==
This species is known from three localities from Kerala - Kottiyoor, Thattekad and Kallar.
