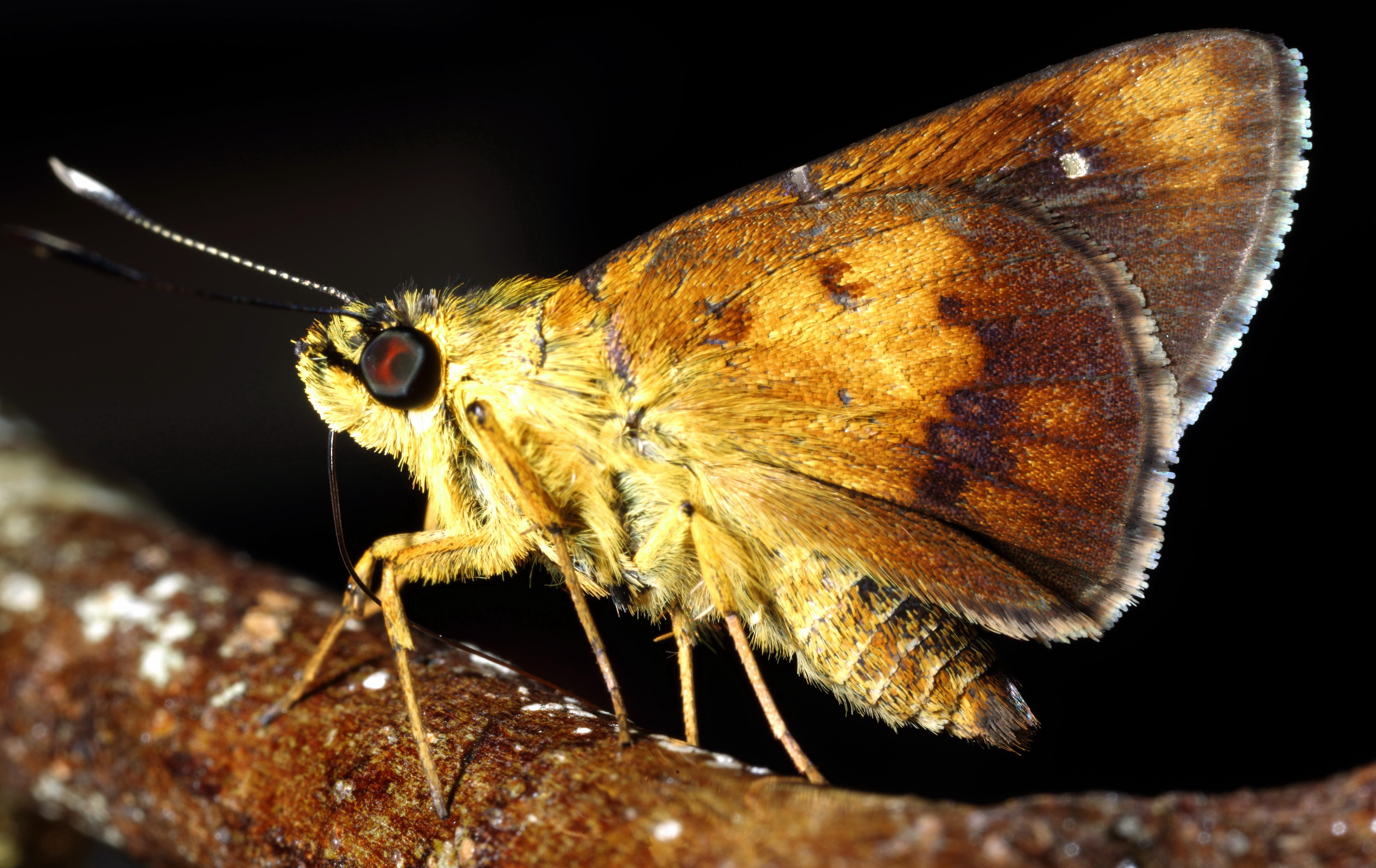

Scientific classification
- Kingdom: Animalia
- Phylum: Arthropoda
- Clade: Pancrustacea
- Class: Insecta
- Order: Lepidoptera
- Family: Hesperiidae
- Genus: Zographetus
- Species: Z. ogygia

Binomial name
- Zographetus ogygia (Hewitson, 1866)

Synonyms
- Hesperia ogygia

= Zographetus ogygia =

Species of butterfly

Zographetus ogygia, the purple spotted flitter, is a butterfly belonging to the family Hesperiidae.

== Distribution ==
From southern India and Sikkim to Malaya, Thailand, Laos, Borneo, Sumatra, Nias, Banka, Java.

== Description ==
In 1866, William Chapman Hewitson described this butterfly as:

Upperside rufous-brown. Anterior wing with five transparent spots; four together in the middle. Underside rufous. Anterior wing with the base and centre brown. Posterior wing with two brown spots before the middle and a transverse band of similar spots at the middle.

— William Chapman Hewitson

== Life history ==
The larvae feed on Aganope thyrsiflora.

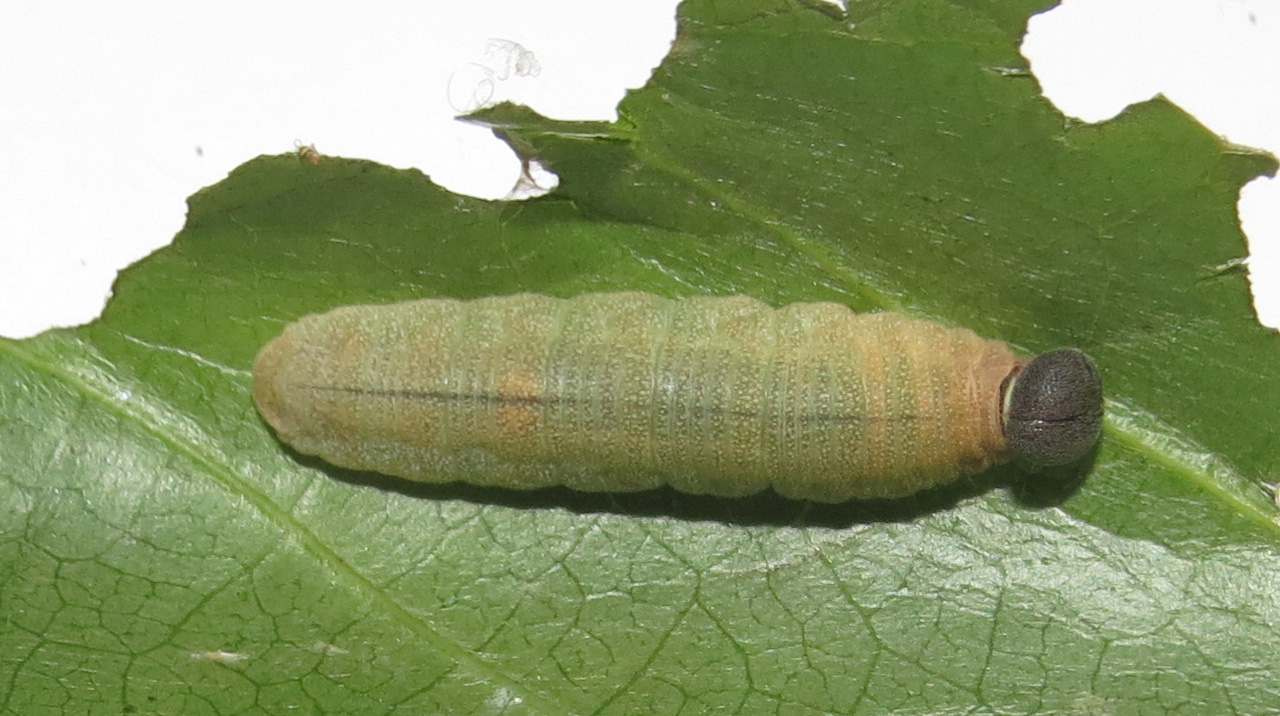
Larva

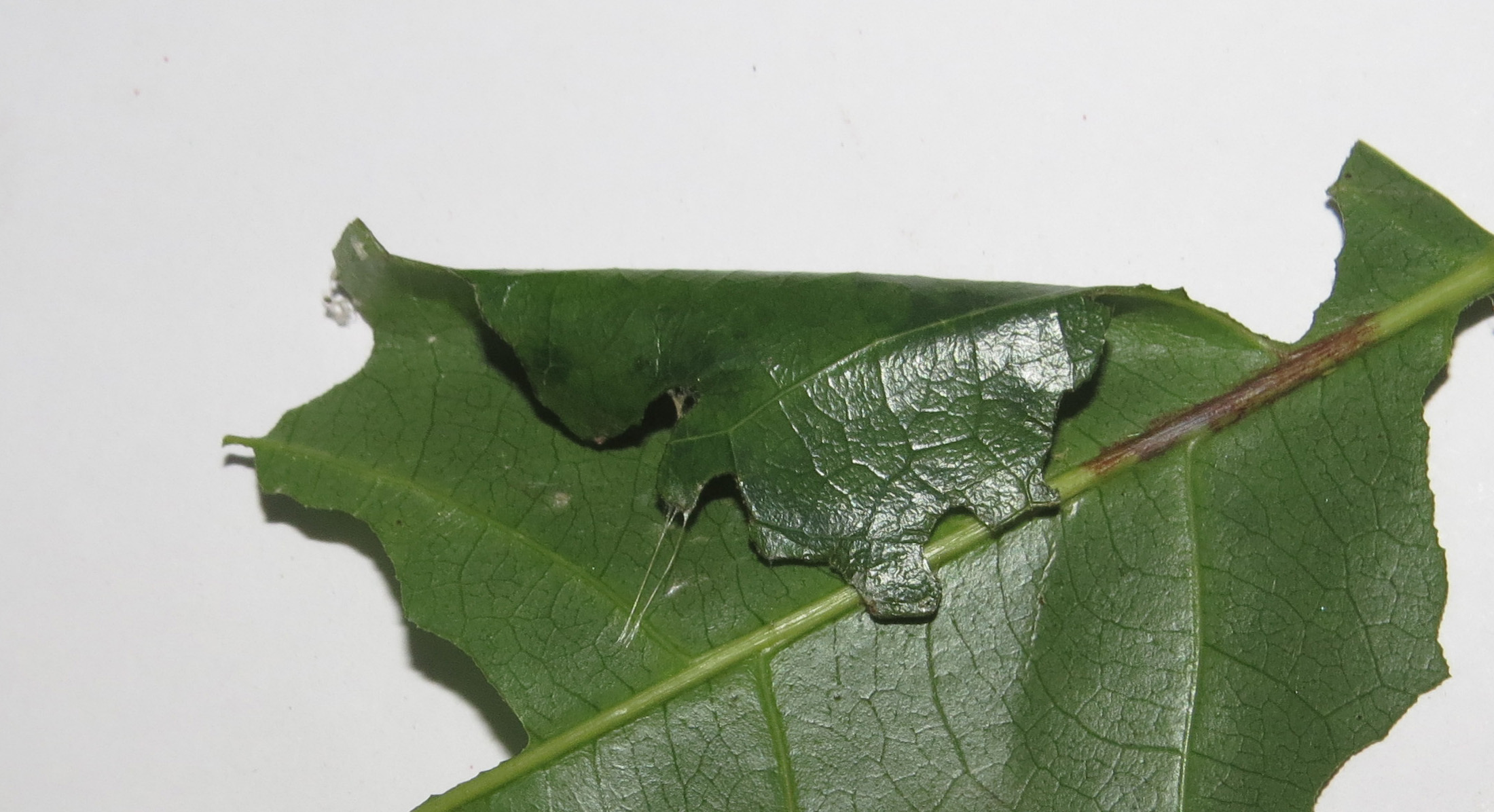
Larval cell

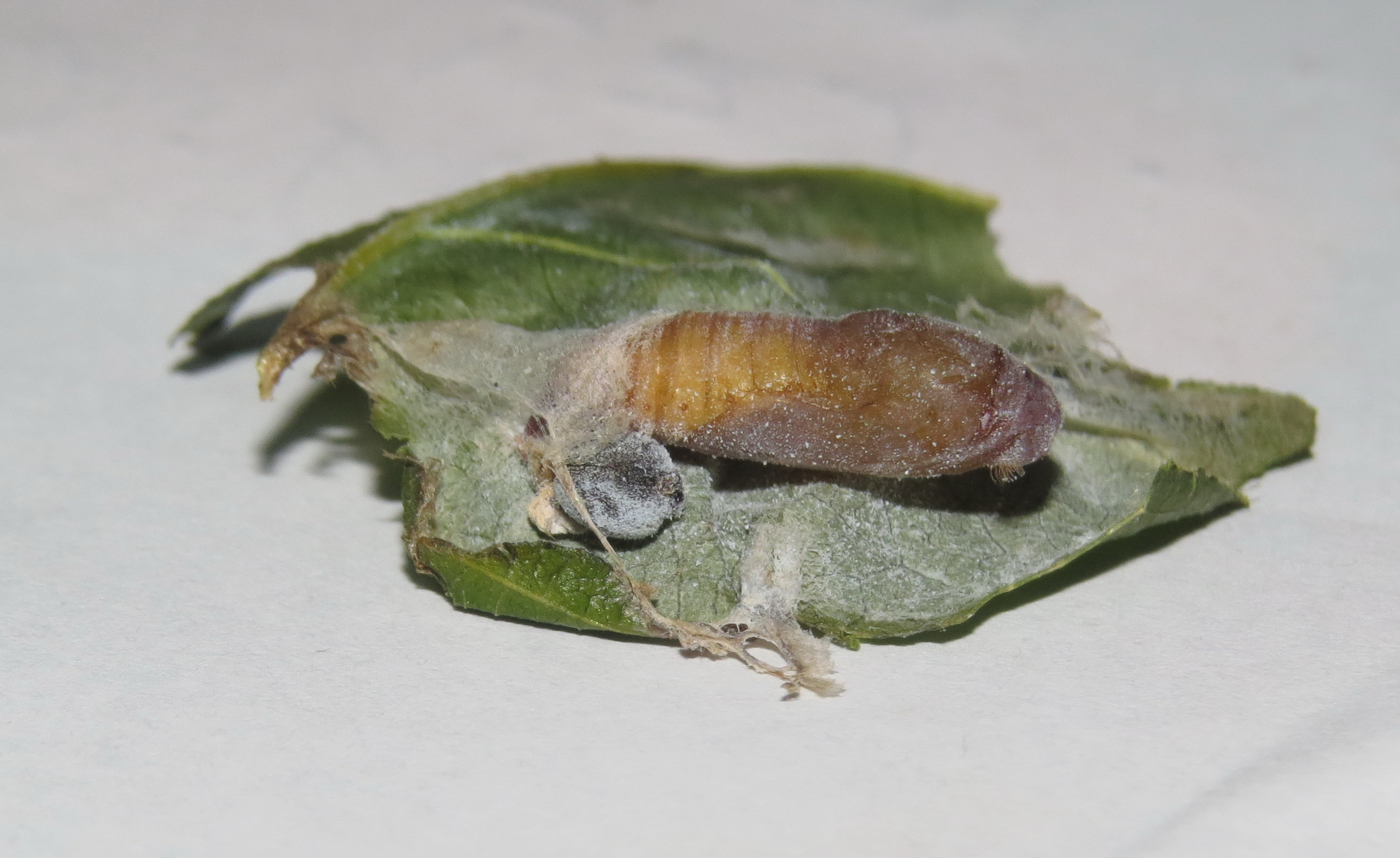
Chrysalis

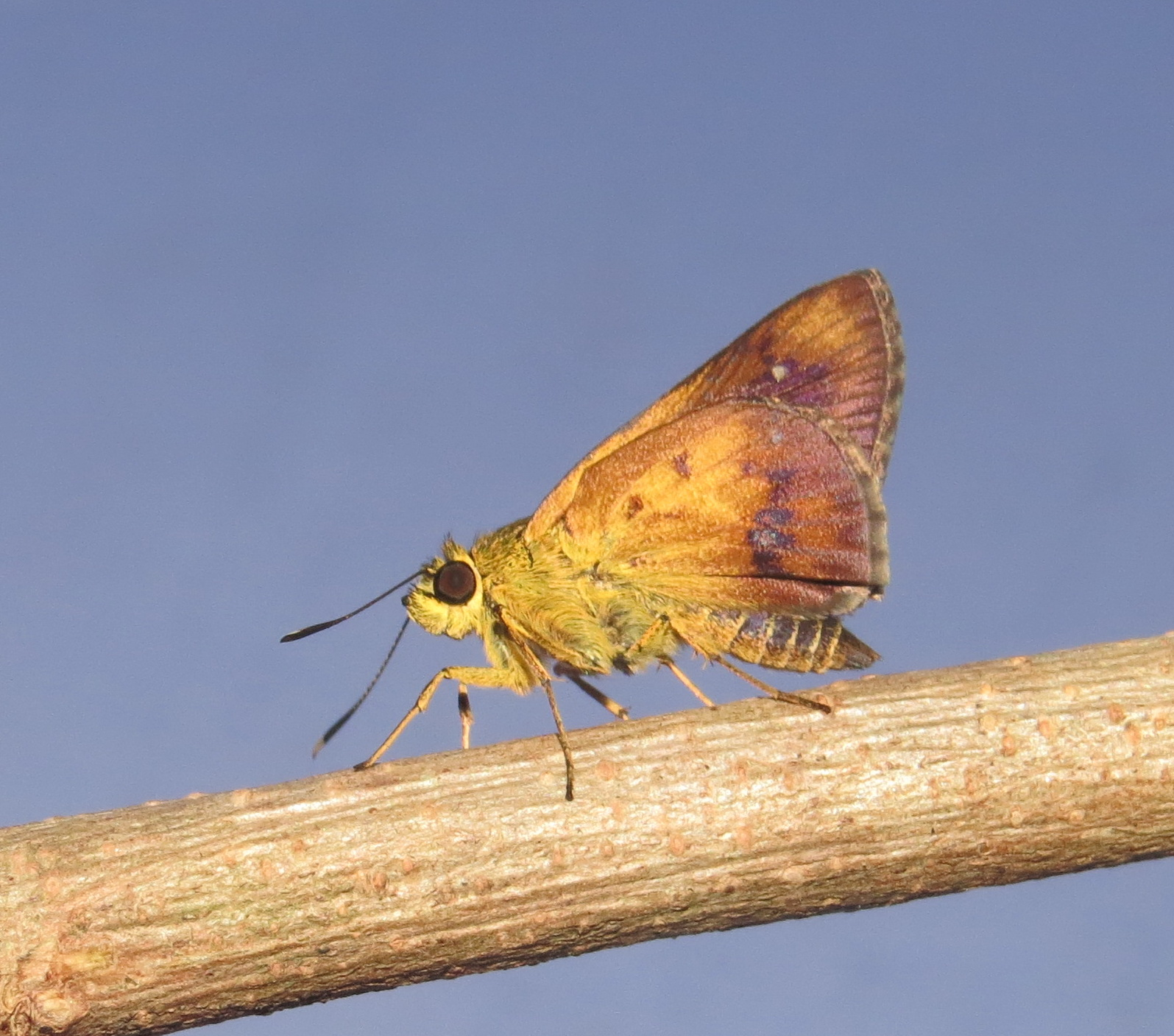
Imago (ventral view)
