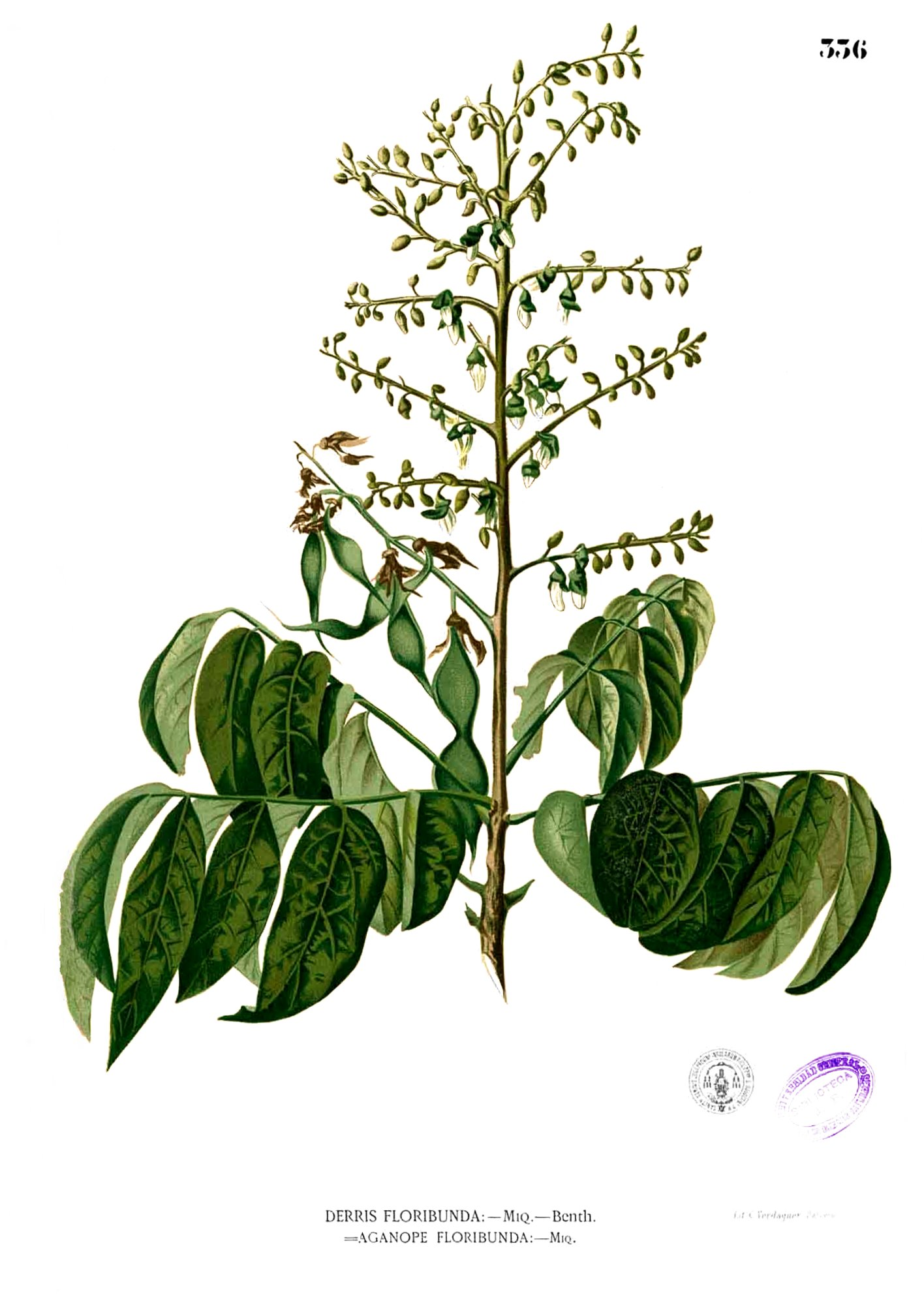
- Aganope thyrsiflora

Scientific classification
- Kingdom: Plantae
- Clade: Tracheophytes
- Clade: Angiosperms
- Clade: Eudicots
- Clade: Rosids
- Order: Fabales
- Family: Fabaceae
- Subfamily: Faboideae
- Tribe: Millettieae
- Genus: Aganope; Miq. (1855)

Synonyms
- Ostryoderris Dunn (1911); Semetor Raf. (1838); Xeroderris Roberty (1954)

= Aganope =

Genus of legumes

Aganope is a genus of flowering plants in the family Fabaceae. It belongs to the subfamily Faboideae. The genus contains 11 species, which range across sub-Saharan Africa, south and southeast Asia, and New Guinea.

== Species ==
Plants of the World Online accepts the following species within Aganope:

- Aganope agastyamalayana M.B.Viswan., Manik. & Tangav.
- Aganope balansae (Gagnep.) L.K.Phan
- Aganope dinghuensis (P.Y.Chen) T.C.Chen & Pedley
- Aganope gabonica (Baill.) Polhill
- Aganope heptaphylla (L.) Polhill
- Aganope impressa (Dunn) Polhill
- Aganope leucobotrya (Dunn) Polhill
- Aganope lucida (Welw. ex Baker) Polhill
- Aganope polystachya (Benth.) Thoth. & D.N.Das
- Aganope stuhlmannii (Taub.) Adema
- Aganope thyrsiflora (Benth.) Polhill
