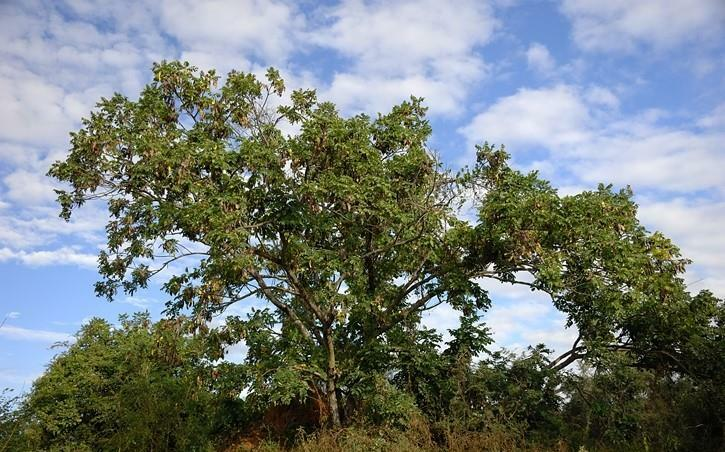

Scientific classification
- Kingdom: Plantae
- Clade: Tracheophytes
- Clade: Angiosperms
- Clade: Eudicots
- Clade: Rosids
- Order: Fabales
- Family: Fabaceae
- Subfamily: Faboideae
- Genus: Aganope
- Species: A. stuhlmannii

Binomial name
- Aganope stuhlmannii (Taub.) Adema

Synonyms
- Deguelia stuhlmannii Taub.; Derris stuhlmannii (Taub.) Harms; Lonchocarpus argenteus A.Chev.; Ostryoderris chevalieri Dunn; Ostryoderris stuhlmannii (Taub.) Dunn; Ostryoderris stuhlmannii (Taub.) Dunn ex Harms; Xeroderris chevalieri (Dunn) Roberty; Xeroderris stuhlmannii (Taub.) Mendonça & E.P.Sousa

= Aganope stuhlmannii =

Species of plant

Aganope stuhlmannii is a deciduous tree within the family Fabaceae. It is native to tropical Africa and grows in savanna woodlands.

== Description ==
Medium-sized tree that can grow up to 27 meters tall, trunk; branchless up to 12 meters, cylindrical, straight, rough - flaky bark covering, grey - brown with red exudate, young twigs with brown hairs. Leaves: alternate arrangement, clustered near the ends of branches, imparipinnate compound with 4 - 8 leaflets. Leaflets, alternate or opposite, oblong-lanceolate to oblong-ovate, 4 × 13 cm long and 2.5 × 6.5 cm wide, rounded apex and rounded to cordate at the base.

== Uses ==
Used as source material of timber, red exudate obtained from bark used for tanning. In Ghana, leaves are used in decoctions to treat malaria fever. In parts of Togo, root bark extracts is used to treat sexual dysfunction and other plant extracts are used by traditional healers to treat a variety of diseases. Root decoctions can have adverse purgative effect.
