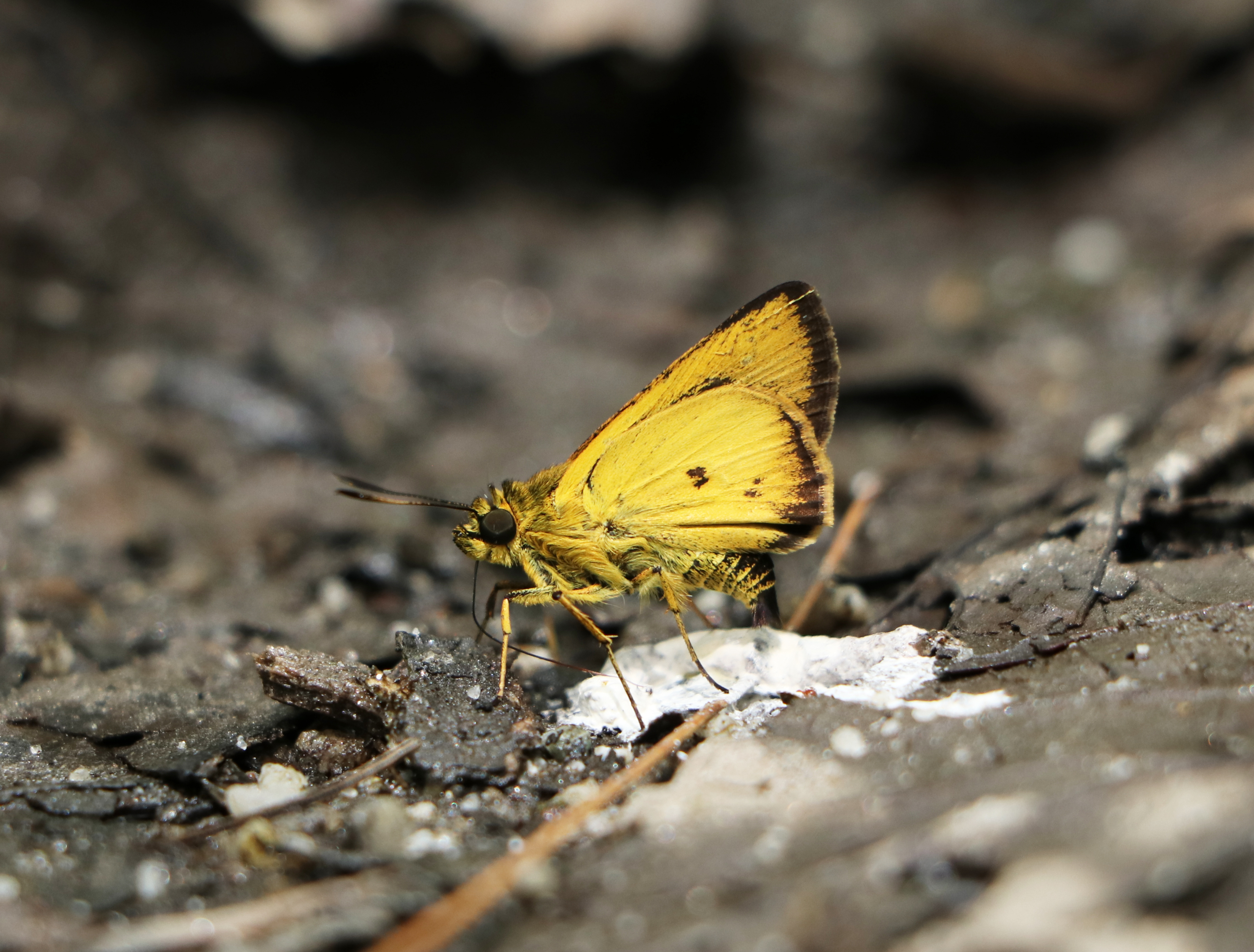

Scientific classification
- Kingdom: Animalia
- Phylum: Arthropoda
- Class: Insecta
- Order: Lepidoptera
- Family: Hesperiidae
- Genus: Zographetus
- Species: Z. dzonguensis

Binomial name
- Zographetus dzonguensis Kunte, Karmakar & Lepcha, 2021

= Zographetus dzonguensis =

Species of butterfly

Zographetus dzonguensis, the chocolate-bordered flitter, is a butterfly belonging to the family Hesperiidae. Z. dzonguensis was named after the area it was found in (Dzongu).

== Description ==
Male: The upperside forewings are dark brown and are covered in ochreous scales, while the hindwings are unmarked. The underside forewings are dark brown while the hindwings are bright yellow.

== Distribution ==
Species was described from Upper Dzongu, North Sikkim District, Sikkim, India.
