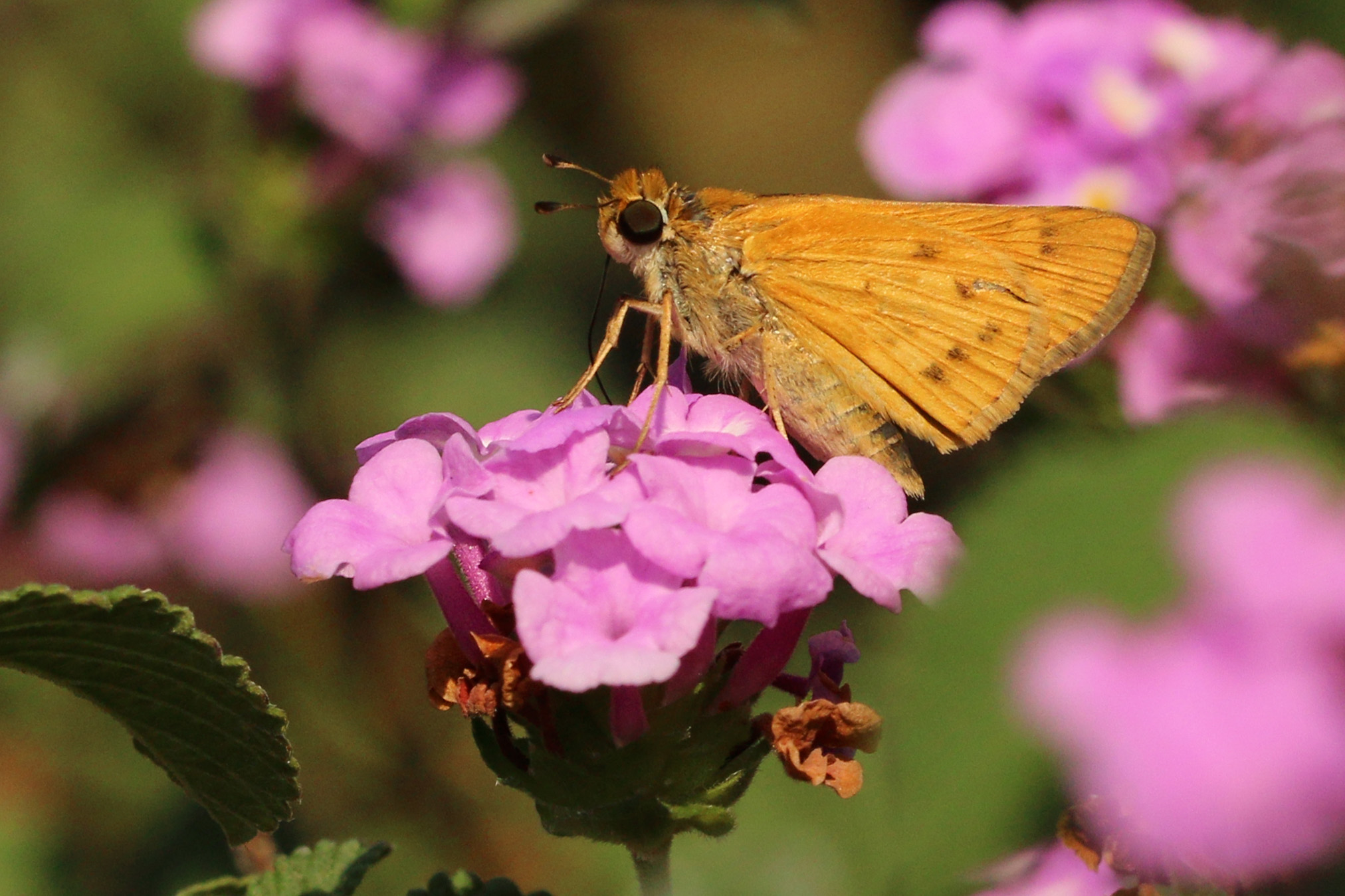
- Zographetus doxus Bali, Indonesia

Scientific classification
- Kingdom: Animalia
- Phylum: Arthropoda
- Class: Insecta
- Order: Lepidoptera
- Family: Hesperiidae
- Subfamily: Hesperiinae
- Tribe: Erionotini
- Genus: Zographetus (Watson, 1893)

Species
- Zographetus abima (Hewitson, 1877); Zographetus doxus Eliot, 1959; Zographetus dzonguensis Kunte, Karmakar & Lepcha, 2021; Zographetus hainanensis Fang & Wan, 2007; Zographetus kutu Eliot, 1959; Zographetus ogygia (Hewitson, 1866); Zographetus ogygioides Elwes & Edwards, 1897; Zographetus pallens de Jong & Treadaway, 1993; Zographetus pangi Fan & Wang, 2007; Zographetus rama (Mabille, 1877); Zographetus satwa (de Nicéville,,1884)

Synonyms
- Gehenna (Watson, 1893)

= Zographetus =

Genus of butterflies

Zographetus is an Indomalayan genus of grass skippers in the family Hesperiidae.

== Species ==
- Zographetus abima (Hewitson, 1877) Celebes
- Zographetus doxus Eliot, 1959 Burma, Thailand, Malaya, Singapore, Borneo
- Zographetus dzonguensis Kunte, Karmakar & Lepcha, 2021 (Sikkim) India
- Zographetus hainanensis Fang & Wan, 2007 China (Hainan)
- Zographetus kutu Eliot, 1959 Selangor
- Zographetus ogygia (Hewitson, 1866) Sikkim to Malaya, Thailand, Laos, Borneo, Sumatra, Nias, Banka, Java
- Zographetus ogygioides Elwes & Edwards, 1897 Thailand, Malaysia, Borneo, Sumatra
- Zographetus pallens de Jong & Treadaway, 1993 Philippines
- Zographetus pangi Fan & Wang, 2007 China (Guangdong)
- Zographetus rama (Mabille, 1877) Burma, Thailand, Laos, Malaya, Langkawi, Singapore, Sumatra, Philippines, Celebes
- Zographetus satwa (de Nicéville, 1884) Sikkim to Burma, Thailand, Laos, Hainan, Malaya, Java
