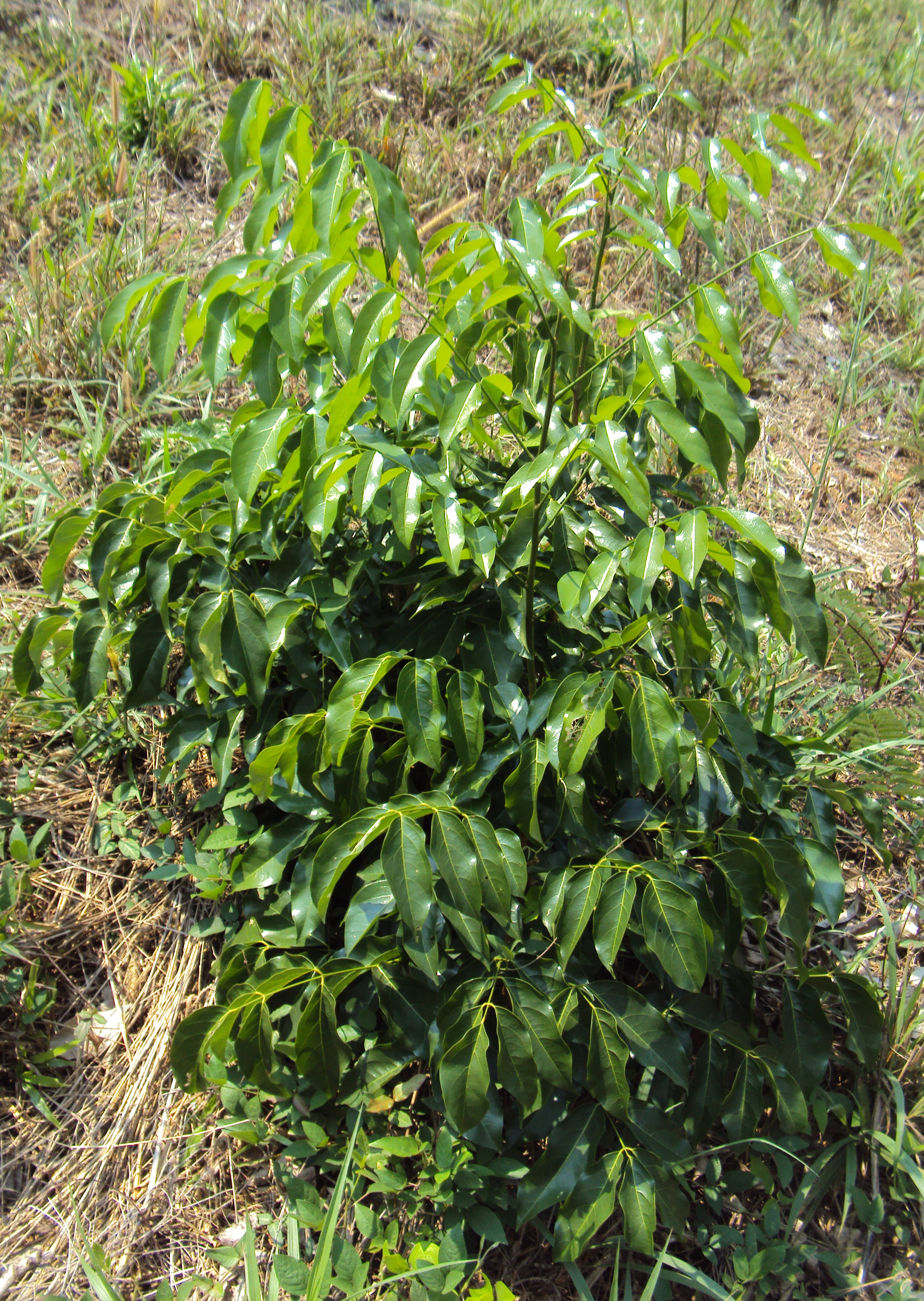
- Aganope thyrsiflora plant from Peravoor

Scientific classification
- Kingdom: Plantae
- Clade: Tracheophytes
- Clade: Angiosperms
- Clade: Eudicots
- Clade: Rosids
- Order: Fabales
- Family: Fabaceae
- Subfamily: Faboideae
- Genus: Aganope
- Species: A. thyrsiflora

Binomial name
- Aganope thyrsiflora (Benth.) Polhill

Synonyms
- Aganope floribunda Miq.; Aganope macrophylla Miq.; Aganope subavenis Miq.; Aganope thyrsiflora var. eualata (Bedd.) Thoth. & D.N.Das; Aganope thyrsiflora var. wallichii (Prain) Thoth. & D.N.Das; Deguelia eualata (Bedd.) Taub.; Deguelia thyrsiflora (Benth.) Taub.; Derris eualata Bedd.; Derris latifolia Prain; Derris platyptera Baker; Derris pyrrothyrsa Miq.; Derris thyrisoflora (Benth.) Benth.; Derris thyrsiflora (Benth.) Benth.; Derris thyrsiflora var. eualata (Bedd.) Thoth.; Derris thyrsiflora var. wallichii (Prain) Thoth.; Derris wallichii Prain; Millettia thyrsiflora Benth.; Pterocarpus thyrsiflorus (Benth.) Kuntze

= Aganope thyrsiflora =

Species of legume

Aganope thyrsiflora is a liana which shows the characters of a shrub when small. It is found in most of the tropical Asian countries.

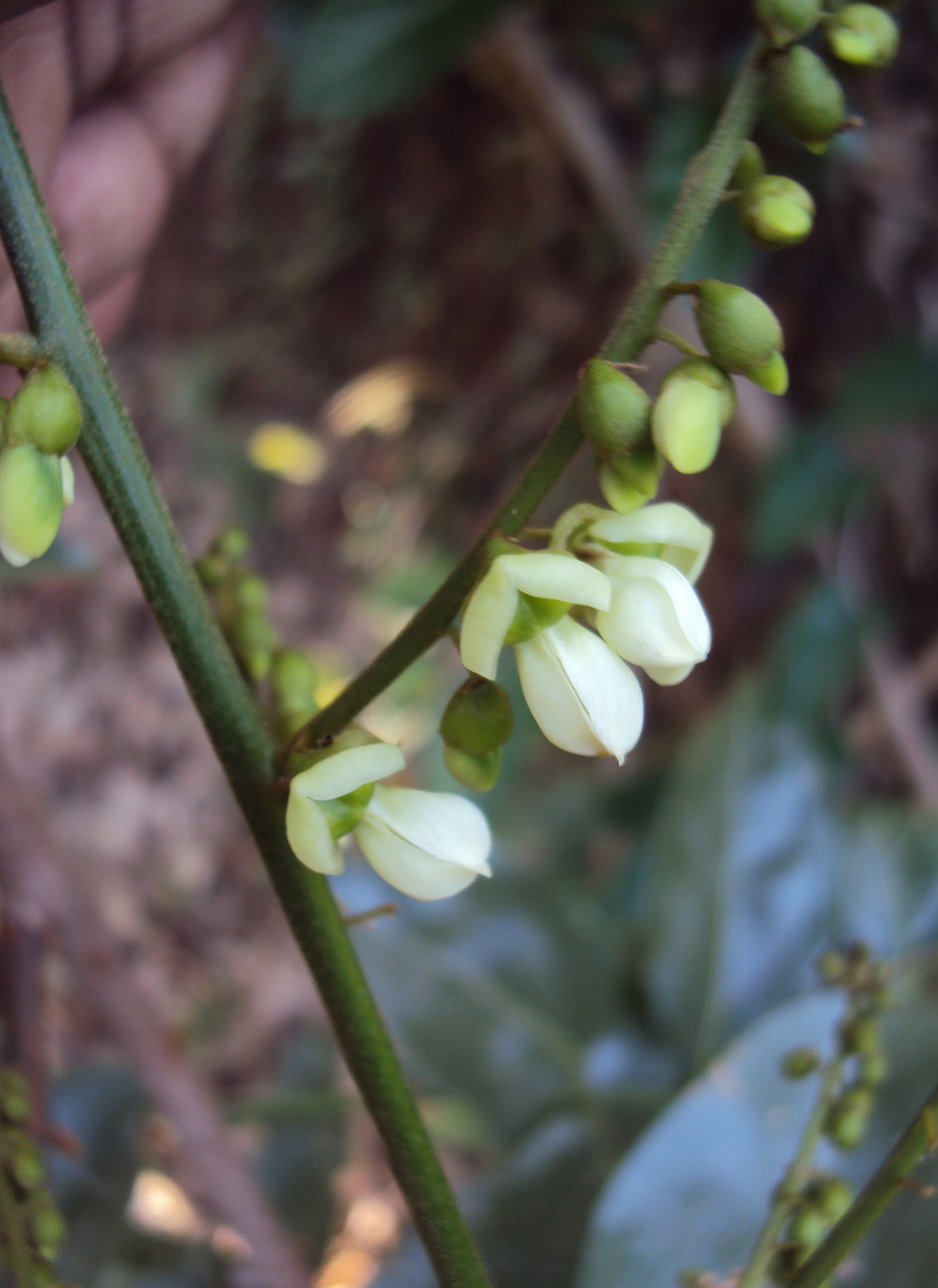
Flowers
