= Vachellia baessleri =

Conservation status
- Critically Endangered (IUCN 3.1)

Scientific classification
- Kingdom: Plantae
- Clade: Tracheophytes
- Clade: Angiosperms
- Clade: Eudicots
- Clade: Rosids
- Order: Fabales
- Family: Fabaceae
- Subfamily: Caesalpinioideae
- Clade: Mimosoid clade
- Genus: Vachellia
- Species: V. baessleri

Binomial name
- Vachellia baessleri H.D.Clarke, Seigler & Ebinger

Species of flowering plant

Vachellia baessleri is a species of flowering plant in the family Fabaceae. It is a tree with yellow flowers, and is native to Cuba. The species was described in 2009, and is listed as Critically Endangered by the IUCN.

== Taxonomy ==
The species was described by Hugh David Clarke, David Stanley Seigler, and John Edwin Ebinger in 2009.

== Distribution ==
Vachellia baessleri is native to the seasonally dry tropical biome of south-central Cuba. It is endemic to Guantánamo and Las Tunas.

It grows at elevations of 5–300 metres (16–984 ft).

== Description ==
Vachellia baessleri is a tree that grows up to 8 metres (26 ft) high. The bark is brown or grey, and rough.

The leaves are arranged alternately, or clustered on shoots. The leaves are 0.2–0.9 millimetres (0.0079–0.0354 in) long. The leaf stems are 0.2–0.9 millimetres (0.0079–0.0354 in) long. Each leaf has one pair of pinnae, and each pinna has three to six leaflets.

The inflorescence is globose or subglobose, densely flowered, and 5–7 millimetres (0.20–0.28 in) wide. The inflorescence stems are 0.8–1.8 millimetres (0.031–0.071 in) long. The flowers are yellow. The calyx is 0.7–0.9 millimetres (0.028–0.035 in) long, and has five lobes. The corolla is 1.3–1.6 millimetres (0.051–0.063 in) long, and has five lobes. The flowers have twenty to twenty-five stamens.The plant has been observed flowering in April and May.

Vachellia baessleri is similar to Vachellia barahonensis and Vachellia belairioides.

== Conservation ==
In 2022, the IUCN assessed Vachellia baessleri as Critically Endangered.

== Nomenclature ==
Vachellia baessleri was initially given the specific epithet baessleria, which was later amended to baessleri. The name honours Manfred Bässler, who was one of the collecters of the type specimen.
