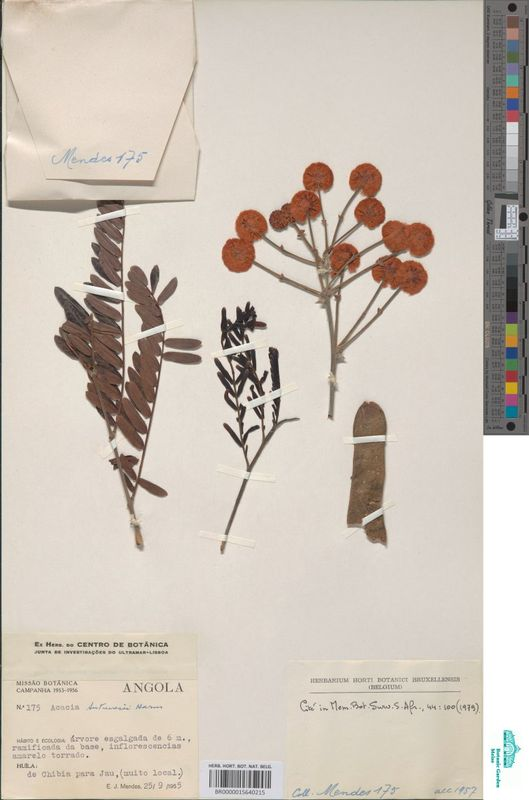

Conservation status
- Vulnerable (IUCN 3.1)

Scientific classification
- Kingdom: Plantae
- Clade: Embryophytes
- Clade: Tracheophytes
- Clade: Angiosperms
- Clade: Eudicots
- Clade: Rosids
- Order: Fabales
- Family: Fabaceae
- Subfamily: Caesalpinioideae
- Clade: Mimosoid clade
- Genus: Vachellia
- Species: V. antunesii

Binomial name
- Vachellia antunesii (Harms) Kyal. & Boatwr.

Synonyms
- Acacia antunesii Harms

= Vachellia antunesii =

Species of flowering plant

Vachellia antunesii is a species of flowering plant in the family Fabaceae. It is a tree native to Angola. The species was described in 1901, and is listed as Vulnerable by the IUCN.

== Taxonomy ==
The species was described by Hermann Harms in 1901, and placed in the genus Acacia. In 2013, Bruce Kyalangalilwa and James S. Boatwright moved it to the genus Vachellia, as part of a larger taxonomic revision of Acacia.

== Distribution ==
Vachellia antunesii is native to the seasonally dry tropical biome of Huíla, Angola. Its extent of occurrence is around 1,000 square kilometres (390 sq mi).

It grows at elevations of 1,100–1,650 metres (3,610–5,410 ft), in upland plateau areas.

== Description ==
Vachellia antunesii is a tree that grows up to 6 metres (20 ft) high, and branches from the base. The young branches are greyish-brown. The epidermis splits to reveal a yellowish or red-brown layer.

Vachellia antunesii is similar to Vachellia amythethophylla and Vachellia ebutsiniorum.

== Conservation ==
In 2021, the IUCN assessed Vachellia antunesii as Vulnerable. It is threatened by clearance of land for agriculture, and does not occur in protected areas.
