= Vachellia azuana =

Scientific classification
- Kingdom: Plantae
- Clade: Tracheophytes
- Clade: Angiosperms
- Clade: Eudicots
- Clade: Rosids
- Order: Fabales
- Family: Fabaceae
- Subfamily: Caesalpinioideae
- Clade: Mimosoid clade
- Genus: Vachellia
- Species: V. azuana

Binomial name
- Vachellia azuana R.G.García, Clase, Ebinger & Seigler

Species of flowering plant

Vachellia azuana is a species of flowering plant in the family Fabaceae. It is a shrub with yellow flowers and dehiscent fruits. The species is native to the Dominican Republic, and was described in 2014.

== Taxonomy ==
The species was described by Ricardo Guarionex García, Teodoro Clase G., John Edwin Ebinger, and David Stanley Seigler in 2014. It is closely related to Vachellia barahonensis, Vachellia cucuyo, Vachellia oviedoensis, and Vachellia caurina.

== Distribution ==
Vachellia azuana is native to the seasonally dry tropical biome of the southwestern Dominican Republic. It grows at elevations of up to 100 metres (330 ft), and is often found near Parasenegalia skleroxyla, Croton, Caesalpinia, and Uniola virgata.

== Description ==
Vachellia azuana is a shrub that grows up to 4 metres (13 ft) high. The bark is light brown and smooth. The older branches usually have clusters of spines.

The leaves are arranged alternately. The leaf stems are 0.7–7 millimetres (0.028–0.276 in) long. Each leaf has one pair of pinnae, and each pinna has two to six pairs of leaflets.

The inflorescence is 4–7 millimetres (0.16–0.28 in) across, densely flowered, globose or subglobose, and grows on a 8–30 millimetres (0.31–1.18 in) long stem. The flowers are yellow. The calyx has five lobes. The corolla is 1.2–1.8 millimetres (0.047–0.071 in) long, and has five lobes. The flowers have twenty-five to thirty-five stamens. The plant has been observed flowering between May and July.

The fruit is a dehiscent, leathery, 3.5–6.5 centimetres (1.4–2.6 in) long, 5–7 millimetres (0.20–0.28 in) wide, flattened, dark reddish-brown legume. The seeds are brown, ellipsoid, 3.5–4.5 millimetres (0.14–0.18 in) long, and 3–3.8 millimetres (0.12–0.15 in) wide.

Vachellia azuana is similar to Vachellia barahonensis.
