= Eupithecia yubitzae =

Scientific classification
- Kingdom: Animalia
- Phylum: Arthropoda
- Clade: Pancrustacea
- Class: Insecta
- Order: Lepidoptera
- Family: Geometridae
- Genus: Eupithecia
- Species: E. yubitzae

Binomial name
- Eupithecia yubitzae H.A. Vargas & Parra, 2004

Species of moth

Eupithecia yubitzae is a moth in the family Geometridae. It is found in the valleys of northern Chile: the Azapa, Chaca and Camarones valleys.

The larvae feed on Acacia macracantha and Prosopis tamarugo.
