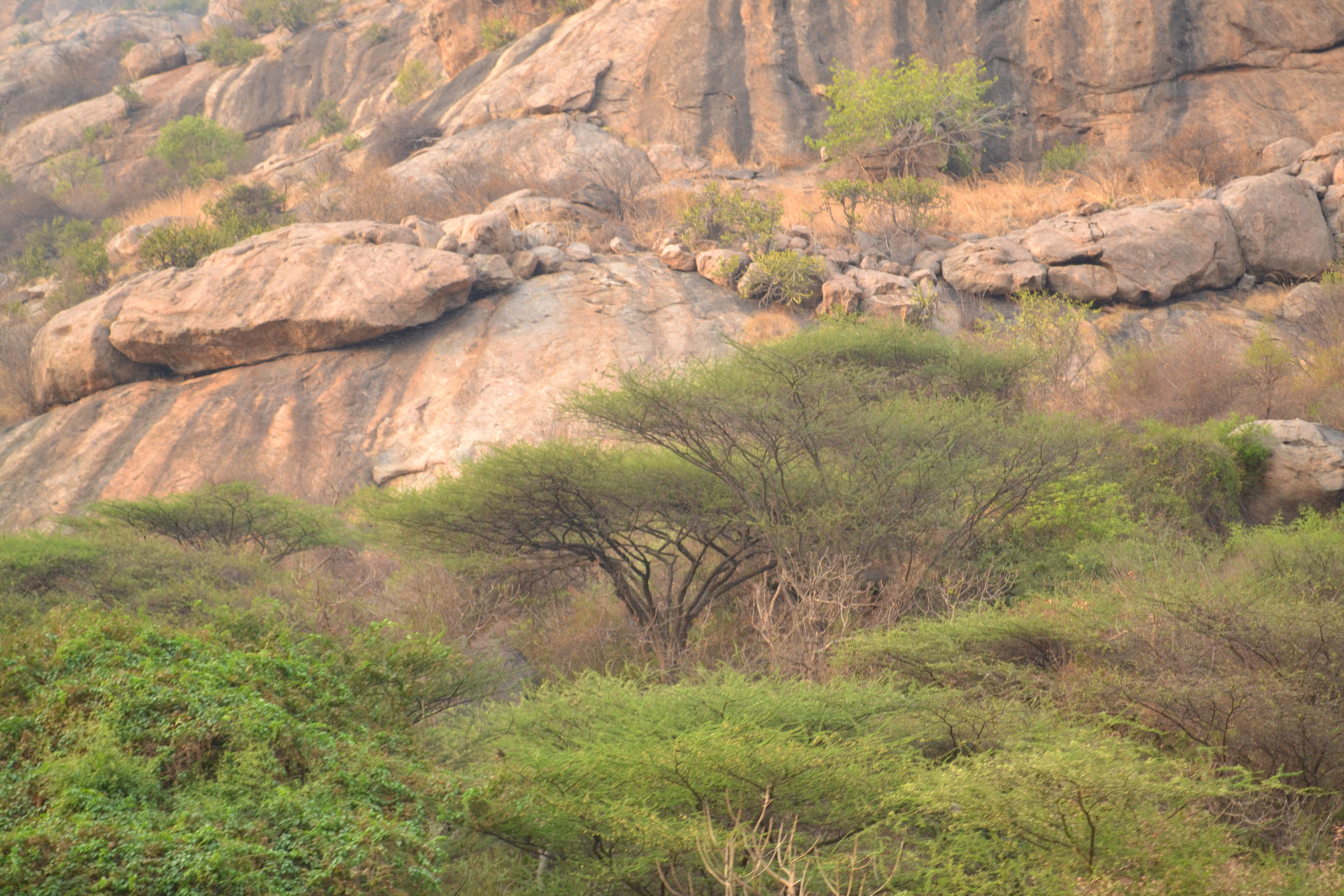

Scientific classification
- Kingdom: Plantae
- Clade: Tracheophytes
- Clade: Angiosperms
- Clade: Eudicots
- Clade: Rosids
- Order: Fabales
- Family: Fabaceae
- Subfamily: Caesalpinioideae
- Clade: Mimosoid clade
- Genus: Vachellia
- Species: V. planifrons

Binomial name
- Vachellia planifrons (Wight & Arn.) Ragup., Seigler, Ebinger & Maslin

Synonyms
- Acacia planifrons; Acacia roxburghii; Mimosa caesia; Mimosa eburnea; Mimosa planifrons; Mimosa umbrifera

= Vachellia planifrons =

Umbrella thorn

Tree species in the pea family

The umbrella thorn, (Vachellia planifrons), is a species of Vachellia of the family Fabaceae. It is native to India and Sri Lanka. It is about 7m high thorny shrub. Greyish-brown bark is thick with horizontal markings. Leaves are bipinnate, alternate; apex obtuse; margin entire. Flowers are white in color. Fruit is a pod.

== Taxonomy ==
Vachellia planifrons was scientifically described in 1834 by Robert Wight and George Arnott Walker Arnott and named Acacia planifrons. Prior to its first valid description Mimosa eburnea was described in 1805, but this name had already been used in 1782. In 2014 it was moved to Vachellia by Subramanyam Ragupathy, David Stanley Seigler, John Edwin Ebinger, and Bruce Maslin. It has no accepted subspecies and six synonyms.

Table of Synonyms
Name	Year	Rank	Notes
Acacia planifrons Wight & Arn.	1834	species	≡ hom.
Acacia roxburghii Wight & Arn.	1834	species	= het.
Mimosa caesia Russell ex Wall.	1831	species	= het., not validly publ.
Mimosa eburnea Roxb.	1805	species	= het., sensu auct.
Mimosa planifrons K.D.Koenig ex Wight & Arn.	1834	species	= het.
Mimosa umbrifera Banks ex Wight & Arn.	1834	species	= het.
Notes: ≡ homotypic synonym; = heterotypic synonym
