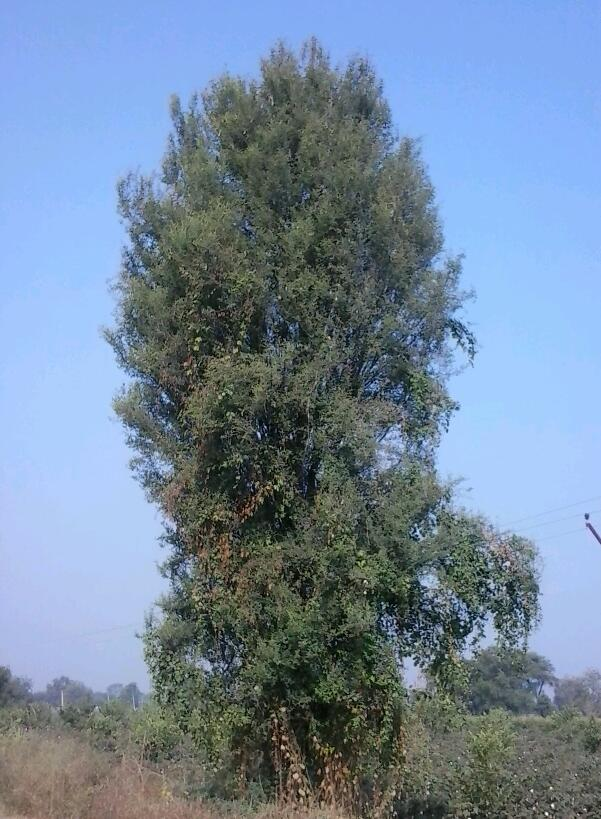

Scientific classification
- Kingdom: Plantae
- Clade: Tracheophytes
- Clade: Angiosperms
- Clade: Eudicots
- Clade: Rosids
- Order: Fabales
- Family: Fabaceae
- Subfamily: Caesalpinioideae
- Clade: Mimosoid clade
- Genus: Vachellia
- Species: V. nilotica
- Subspecies: V. n. subsp. cupressiformis

Trinomial name
- Vachellia nilotica subsp. cupressiformis (J.L.Stewart) Ali & Faruqi

Synonyms
- Acacia nilotica subsp. cupressiformis (J.L.Stewart) Ali & Faruqi

= Vachellia nilotica subsp. cupressiformis =

Subspecies of legume

Vachellia nilotica subsp. cupressiformis is a tree native to India and Pakistan. Common names for it include kabuli kikar, ramkanta and ramkati babul.
