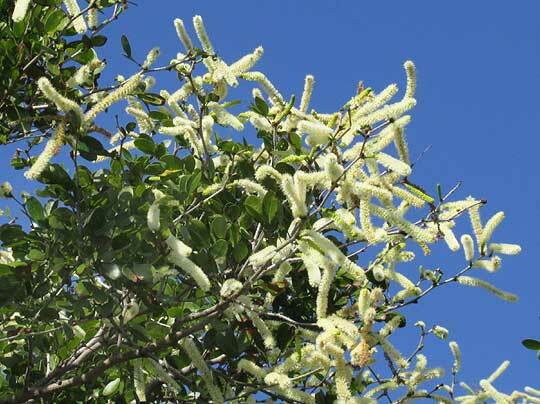
- Vachellia pringlei in flower

Scientific classification
- Kingdom: Plantae
- Clade: Tracheophytes
- Clade: Angiosperms
- Clade: Eudicots
- Clade: Rosids
- Order: Fabales
- Family: Fabaceae
- Subfamily: Caesalpinioideae
- Clade: Mimosoid clade
- Genus: Vachellia
- Species: V. pringlei

Binomial name
- Vachellia pringlei (Rose) Seigler & Ebinger

= Vachellia pringlei =

Species of plant

Vachellia pringlei is a species of flowering plant belonging to the mimosoid clade of the family Fabaceae.

== Description ==
Features distinguishing Vachellia pringlei from the many Acacia species and other species of Vachellia include these:

- They are shrubs or trees up to 10 meters tall (33feet), without large thorns but at petiole bases they develop stipular spines 1–3 cm long.
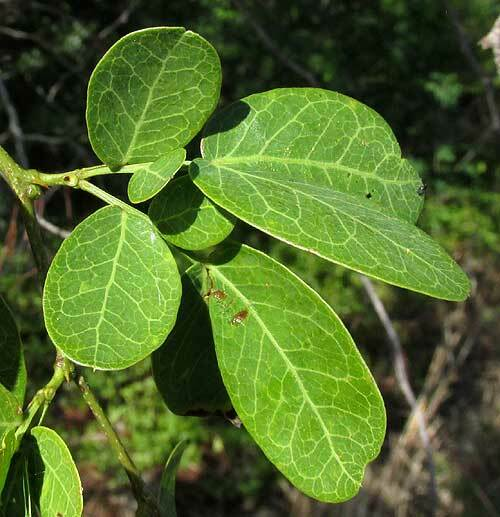
Bipinnate leaf of Vachellia pringlei
- Leaves are twice divided (bipinnate), with each first division divided into four leaflets or six, thus developing 8 or 12 leaflets in all; leaflets are 1.5 to 5 cm long (~2 inches), and hairless or nearly so.
- Petioles bear a conspicuous gland, an extrafloral nectary.
- Inflorescences are up to 12 cm long (4.7 inches), with flowers lacking stalks, or pedicels.
- Legume-type fruits are up to 20 cm long (~8 inches), hairless, straight or curved, cylindrical in cross-section and constricted between seeds; the fruits are dehiscent.
- The species is extremely variable morphologically.

== Distribution ==
The GBIF map showing confirmed, georeferenced observations of Vachellia pringlei register the species' presence throughout Mexico from the Yucatan Peninsula to Baja California. Also there are reports from the southeastern USA.

== Habitat ==
In northeastern Mexico Vachellia pringlei inhabits Tamaulipan thorn scrub, of the Deserts and Xeric Shrublands ecoregion. In the northern Yucatan Peninsula it is described as occurring in mangrove areas, low-growing deciduous forest (often with cacti), low, sometimes flooded areas, and medium-height, semi-evergreen forests.

== Human uses ==
Traditionally, Vachellia pringlei has been used medicinally to treat skin problems and digestive and respiratory disorders. Also it is valued for attracting honey-producing bees, for firewood and construction, for use in veterinary medicine, plus, the gum which exudes from its trunk can be used as an adhesive.

== Taxonomy ==
Because of the extremely variable morphology of Vachellia pringlei, Britton and Rose (1928), Standley (1922) and others have divided this taxon into three or four species now understood to be regional variations not embodying differences significant enough to warrant status as a separate species.

For many years the taxon resided in the genus Acacia. However, in 2005, morphological and genetic studies showed that Acacia s.l. was polyphyetic, and that the then-recognized infrageneric relationships of Acacia species indicated that Acacia should be split into as many as five genera. Thus the genus Vachellia was resurrected, having been first published in 1834, and Vachellia pringlei made its way into it.

=== Synonyms ===
- Acacia californica subsp. pringlei (Rose) L.Rico (2007)
- Acacia pringlei Rose (1895)
- Acaciopsis pringlei (Rose) Britton & Rose (1928)
- Acacia conzattii Standly (1919)
- Acacia sesquijuga (Britton & Rose) Standl. (1929)
- Acaia unijuga Rose (1901)
- Acaciopsis conzattii (Standl.) Britton & Rose (1928)
- Acaciopsis sesquijuga Britton & Rose (1928)
- Acaciopsis unijuga (Rose) Britton & Rose (1928)

== Etymology ==
The genus Vachellia was named in honor of George Harvey Vachell, 1799-1839, who collected plants in China.

The species name "pringlei" is a pseudo-Latin name presumably honoring US botanist Cyrus Pringle, who between 1885 and 1909 made 39 plant-collecting expeditions to Mexico.

== Gallery ==
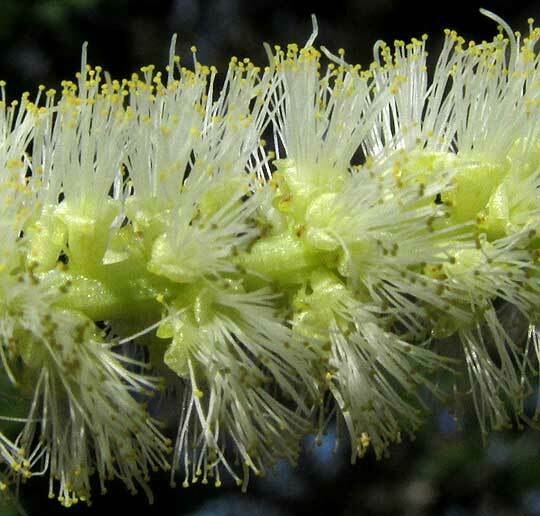
Vachellia pringlei flowers

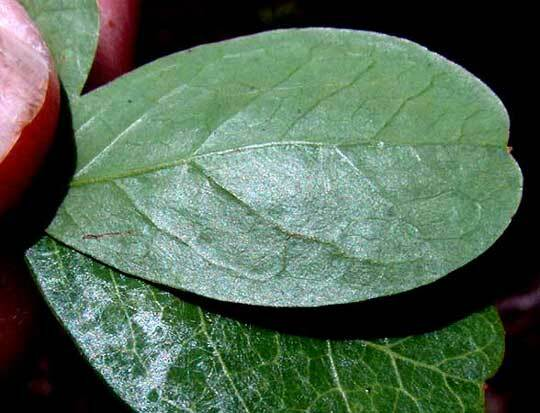
Vachellia pringlei leaflets

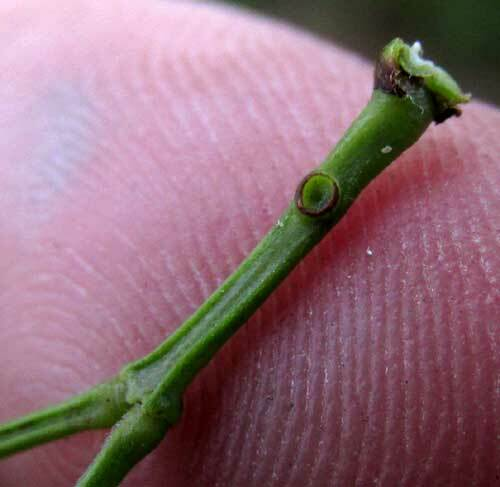
Vachellia pringlei gland on petiole

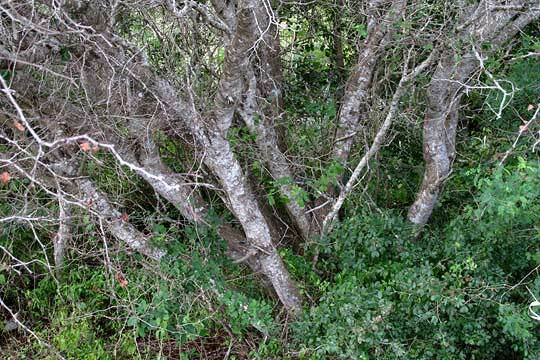
Vachellia pringlei trunk branching from base

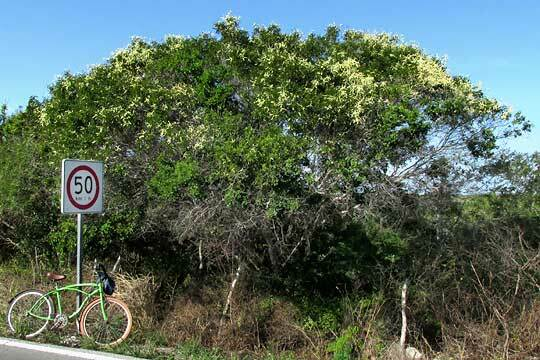
Vachellia pringlei roadside tree
