= Vachellia albicorticata =

Conservation status
- Least Concern (IUCN 3.1)

Scientific classification
- Kingdom: Plantae
- Clade: Tracheophytes
- Clade: Angiosperms
- Clade: Eudicots
- Clade: Rosids
- Order: Fabales
- Family: Fabaceae
- Subfamily: Caesalpinioideae
- Clade: Mimosoid clade
- Genus: Vachellia
- Species: V. albicorticata

Binomial name
- Vachellia albicorticata (Burkart) Seigler & Ebinger

Species of legume

Acacia albicorticata is a species of legume in the family Fabaceae. It is found in Argentina, Bolivia and Paraguay.
