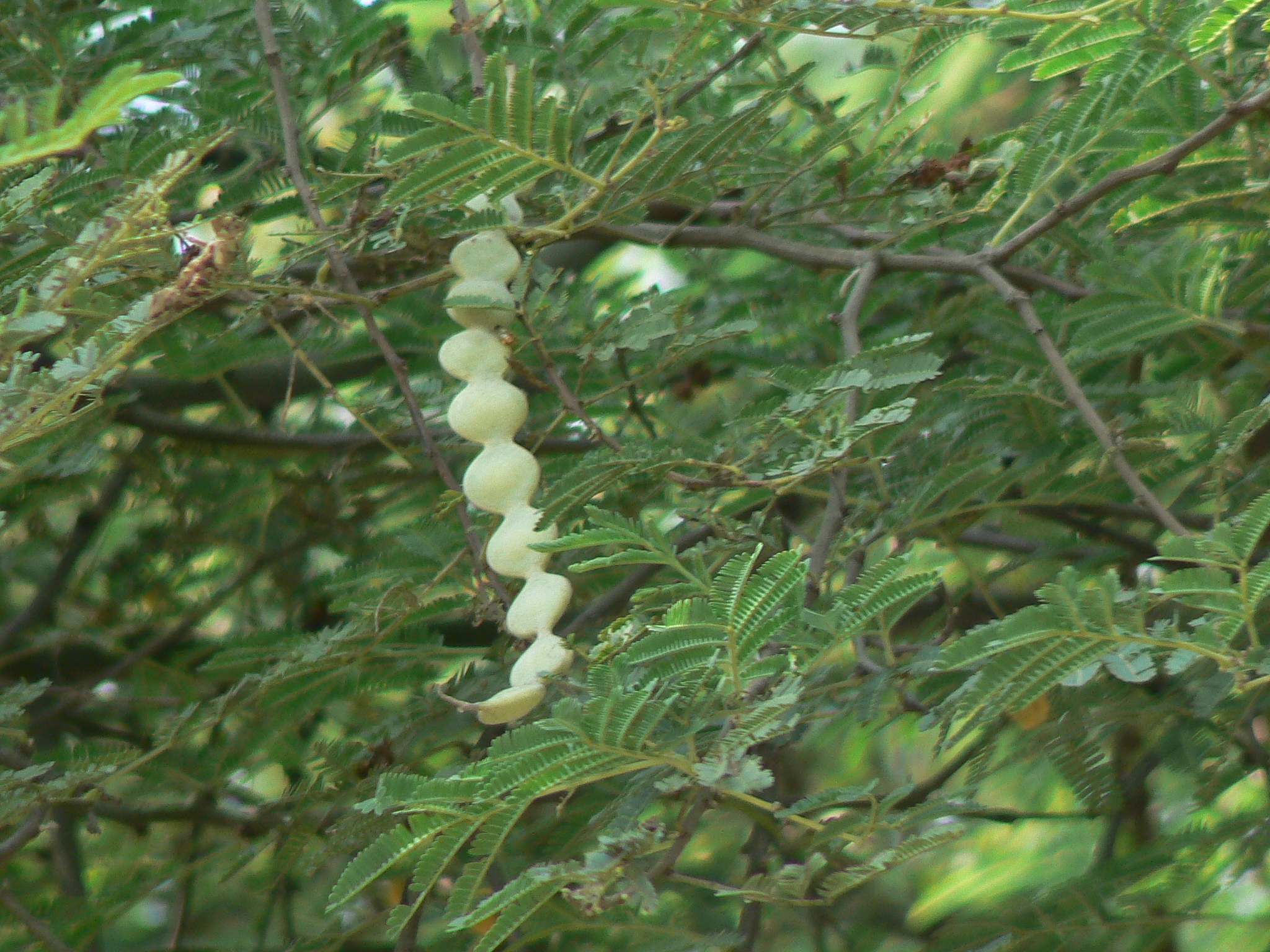

Scientific classification
- Kingdom: Plantae
- Clade: Tracheophytes
- Clade: Angiosperms
- Clade: Eudicots
- Clade: Rosids
- Order: Fabales
- Family: Fabaceae
- Subfamily: Caesalpinioideae
- Clade: Mimosoid clade
- Genus: Vachellia
- Species: V. nilotica
- Subspecies: V. n. subsp. tomentosa

Trinomial name
- Vachellia nilotica subsp. tomentosa (Benth.) Kyal. & Boatwr.

Synonyms
- Acacia arabica var. tomentosa Benth.; Acacia nilotica var. tomentosa (Benth.) A.F.Hill; Acacia nilotica var. tomentosa (Benth.) Brenan

= Vachellia nilotica subsp. tomentosa =

Subspecies of legume

Vachellia nilotica subsp. tomentosa is a perennial tree native to Africa, Asia and India.

== Uses ==
=== Tannin ===
The pods without seeds of V. nilotica subsp. tomentosa have a tannin content of about 50%.
