= Vachellia nilotica subsp. hemispherica =

Scientific classification
- Kingdom: Plantae
- Clade: Tracheophytes
- Clade: Angiosperms
- Clade: Eudicots
- Clade: Rosids
- Order: Fabales
- Family: Fabaceae
- Subfamily: Caesalpinioideae
- Clade: Mimosoid clade
- Genus: Vachellia
- Species: V. nilotica
- Subspecies: V. n. subsp. hemispherica

Trinomial name
- Vachellia nilotica subsp. hemispherica Ali & Faruqi

Synonyms
- Acacia nilotica subsp. hemispherica Ali & Faruqi

Subspecies of legume

Vachellia nilotica subsp. hemispherica is a perennial tree native to Pakistan. Its uses include forage and wood.
