= Vachellia roigii =

Conservation status
- Critically Endangered (IUCN 3.1)

Scientific classification
- Kingdom: Plantae
- Clade: Tracheophytes
- Clade: Angiosperms
- Clade: Eudicots
- Clade: Rosids
- Order: Fabales
- Family: Fabaceae
- Subfamily: Caesalpinioideae
- Clade: Mimosoid clade
- Genus: Vachellia
- Species: V. roigii

Binomial name
- Vachellia roigii (León) Siegler & Ebinger

Synonyms
- Acacia roigii León

Species of legume

Vachellia roigii is a species of flowering plant in the family Fabaceae. It is a shrub or tree endemic to Las Tunas Province in central-eastern Cuba, where it grows in dry forest and shrubland. It is threatened by habitat loss.
