= Vachellia bavazzanoi =

Conservation status
- Vulnerable (IUCN 3.1)

Scientific classification
- Kingdom: Plantae
- Clade: Tracheophytes
- Clade: Angiosperms
- Clade: Eudicots
- Clade: Rosids
- Order: Fabales
- Family: Fabaceae
- Subfamily: Caesalpinioideae
- Clade: Mimosoid clade
- Genus: Vachellia
- Species: V. bavazzanoi

Binomial name
- Vachellia bavazzanoi (Pic.Serm.) Kyal. & Boatwr.

Synonyms
- Acacia bavazzanoi Pic.Serm.

Species of flowering plant

Vachellia bavazzanoi is a species of flowering plant in the family Fabaceae. It is a tree native to Eritrea and Ethiopia, and was described in 1951.

== Taxonomy ==
The species was described by Rodolfo Emilio Giuseppe Pichi-Sermolli in 1951, and placed in the genus Acacia. In 2013, Bruce Kyalangalilwa and James S. Boatwright. moved it to the genus Vachellia.

== Distribution ==
Vachellia bavazzanoi is native to the deserts and dry shrublands of Eritrea and Ethiopia. It grows at elevations of 1,680–2,400 metres (5,510–7,870 ft), and has an extent of occurrence of over 100,000 metres (330,000 ft).

== Description ==
Vachellia bavazzanoi is a tree that grows up to 6 metres (20 ft) high. The stem and branches are powdery and yellowish. The crown is flat and spreading.

== Conservation ==
In 2018, the IUCN assessed Vachellia bavazzanoi as Vulnerable. It is threatened by habitat loss.
