= Vachellia permixta =

Conservation status
- Least Concern (IUCN 3.1)

Scientific classification
- Kingdom: Plantae
- Clade: Tracheophytes
- Clade: Angiosperms
- Clade: Eudicots
- Clade: Rosids
- Order: Fabales
- Family: Fabaceae
- Subfamily: Caesalpinioideae
- Clade: Mimosoid clade
- Genus: Vachellia
- Species: V. permixta

Binomial name
- Vachellia permixta (Burtt Davy) Kyal. & Boatwr.

Synonyms
- Acacia permixta Burtt Davy

Species of legume

Vachellia permixta, the hairy acacia, is a species of plant in the family Fabaceae. It is found in Botswana, the Northern Provinces of South Africa, and Zimbabwe.
