= Vachellia origena =

Conservation status
- Near Threatened (IUCN 2.3)

Scientific classification
- Kingdom: Plantae
- Clade: Tracheophytes
- Clade: Angiosperms
- Clade: Eudicots
- Clade: Rosids
- Order: Fabales
- Family: Fabaceae
- Subfamily: Caesalpinioideae
- Clade: Mimosoid clade
- Genus: Vachellia
- Species: V. origena

Binomial name
- Vachellia origena (Hunde) Kyal. & Boatwr.

Synonyms
- Acacia origena Hunde

Species of legume

Vachellia origena is a species of plant in the family Fabaceae. It is found in Eritrea, Ethiopia, and Yemen.
