= Vachellia nilotica subsp. subalata =

Scientific classification
- Kingdom: Plantae
- Clade: Tracheophytes
- Clade: Angiosperms
- Clade: Eudicots
- Clade: Rosids
- Order: Fabales
- Family: Fabaceae
- Subfamily: Caesalpinioideae
- Clade: Mimosoid clade
- Genus: Vachellia
- Species: V. nilotica
- Subspecies: V. n. subsp. subalata

Trinomial name
- Vachellia nilotica subsp. subalata (Vatke) Kyal. & Boatwr.

Synonyms
- Acacia arabica var. vediana T.Cooke; Acacia nilotica subsp. vediana (T.Cooke) Vajr. & Kamble; Acacia nilotica subsp. subalata (Vatke) Brenan; Acacia subalata Vatke

Subspecies of legume

Vachellia nilotica subsp. subalata is a perennial tree native to Africa, India and Pakistan. Its uses include forage and wood. A common name for it is kauria babul.

== Uses ==
=== Wood ===
The wood is not affected much by termites.
