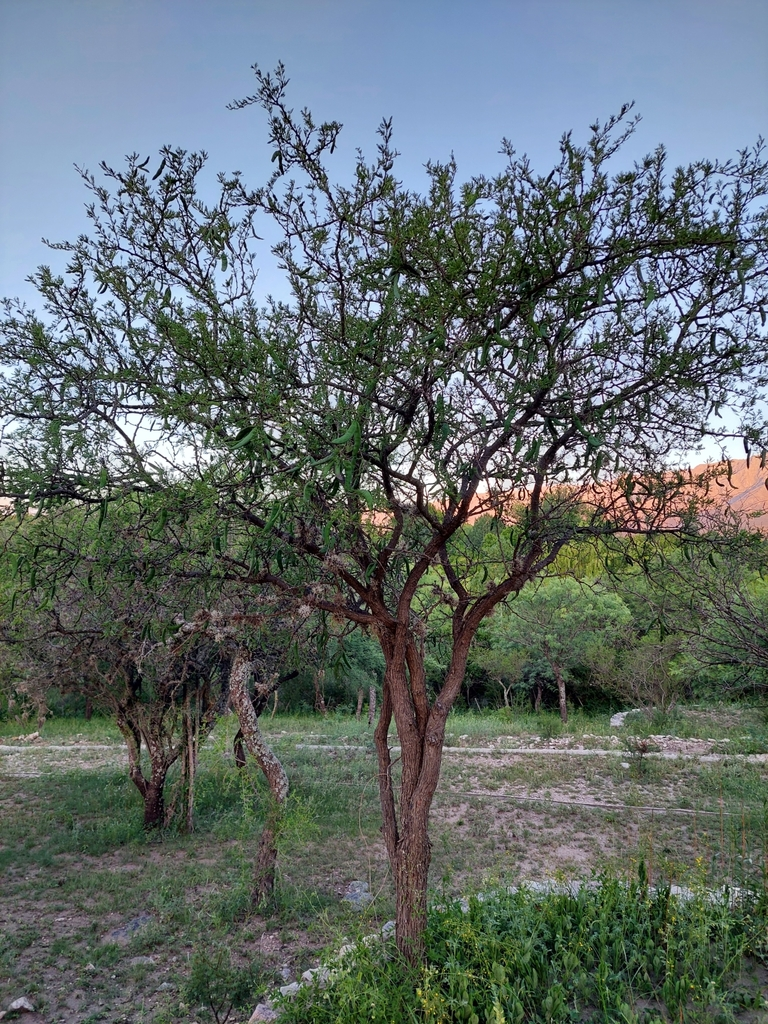

Conservation status
- Least Concern (IUCN 3.1)

Scientific classification
- Kingdom: Plantae
- Clade: Embryophytes
- Clade: Tracheophytes
- Clade: Angiosperms
- Clade: Eudicots
- Clade: Rosids
- Order: Fabales
- Family: Fabaceae
- Subfamily: Caesalpinioideae
- Clade: Mimosoid clade
- Genus: Vachellia
- Species: V. astringens

Binomial name
- Vachellia astringens (Gillies ex Hook. & Arn.) Speg.

Synonyms
- Acacia atramentaria Benth.; Acacia farnesiana var. atramentaria (Benth.) Kuntze; Prosopis astringens Gillies ex Hook. & Arn.; Acacia prosopoma O.Schnyd.

= Vachellia astringens =

Species of flowering plant

Vachellia astringens is a species of flowering plant in the family Fabaceae. It is a tree native to south America. The species was described in 1833, and is listed as of Least Concern by the IUCN.

== Taxonomy ==
The species was described as Prosopis astringens by William Jackson Hooker and George Arnott Walker Arnott in 1833, following an earlier, invalid publication by John Gillies. In 1924, Carlo Luigi Spegazzini moved the species from Prosopis to Vachellia.

== Distribution ==
Vachellia astringens is native to the subtropical biome of north-east and north-west Argentina, southern Brazil, northern Chile, Paraguay, and Uruguay. The species grows in forests and shrublands, at elevations of up to 1,000 metres (3,300 ft).

== Description ==
Vachellia astringens is a tree.

== Uses ==
The wood is used, and the bark is used for tanning.

== Conservation ==
In 2020, the IUCN assessed Vachellia astringens as of Least Concern. It has a wide distribution, and the population is thought to be large. The species is present in protected areas.

== Nomenclature ==
In Argentine Spanish, the species is known as Espinillo negro.
