= Vachellia bellula =

Conservation status
- Least Concern (IUCN 3.1)

Scientific classification
- Kingdom: Plantae
- Clade: Tracheophytes
- Clade: Angiosperms
- Clade: Eudicots
- Clade: Rosids
- Order: Fabales
- Family: Fabaceae
- Subfamily: Caesalpinioideae
- Clade: Mimosoid clade
- Genus: Vachellia
- Species: V. bellula

Binomial name
- Vachellia bellula (Drake) Boatwr.

Synonyms
- Acacia bellula Drake

Species of flowering plant

Vachellia bellula is a species of flowering plant in the family Fabaceae. It is a shrub or tree native to Madagascar. The species was described in 1897, and is listed as of Least Concern by the IUCN.

== Taxonomy ==
The species was described by Emmanuel Drake del Castillo in 1897, and placed in the genus Acacia. In 2015, James S. Boatwright moved it to the genus Vachellia. Vachellia bellula is a sister species to Vachellia reficiens.

== Distribution ==
Vachellia bellula is native to the seasonally dry tropical biome of west and south Madagascar. Its extent of occurrence is around 265,644 square kilometres (102,566 sq mi). The species is present at elevations of 10–800 metres (33–2,625 ft).

== Description ==
Vachellia bellula is a shrub or tree. It grows up to 11 metres (36 ft) high.

== Conservation ==
In 2018, the IUCN assessed Vachellia bellula as of least Concern. The species is experiencing habitat loss due to agriculture, mining, logging, and fire. It is present in five protected areas - Andranomena Special Reserve, Ankarafantsika National Park, Berenty Reserve, Tsimanampetsotsa National Park, and Tsinjoriake Reserve.
