= Vachellia montana =

Scientific classification
- Kingdom: Plantae
- Clade: Tracheophytes
- Clade: Angiosperms
- Clade: Eudicots
- Clade: Rosids
- Order: Fabales
- Family: Fabaceae
- Subfamily: Caesalpinioideae
- Clade: Mimosoid clade
- Genus: Vachellia
- Species: V. montana

Binomial name
- Vachellia montana (P.P.Swartz) Kyal. & Boatwr.

Synonyms
- Acacia theronii P.P.Swartz

Species of legume

Vachellia montana is a species of legume in the family Fabaceae. The Latin specific epithet montana refers to mountains or coming from mountains.
