= Vachellia californica =

Scientific classification
- Kingdom: Plantae
- Clade: Tracheophytes
- Clade: Angiosperms
- Clade: Eudicots
- Clade: Rosids
- Order: Fabales
- Family: Fabaceae
- Subfamily: Caesalpinioideae
- Clade: Mimosoid clade
- Genus: Vachellia
- Species: V. californica

Binomial name
- Vachellia californica (Brandegee) Seigler & Ebinger

Species of plant

Vachellia californica is a small tree native to Mexico. Despite the epithet, this species is not found in California. It was discovered in Baja California Sur, and also grow in the Mexican states on the other side of the Gulf of California (Sinaloa and Sonora).
