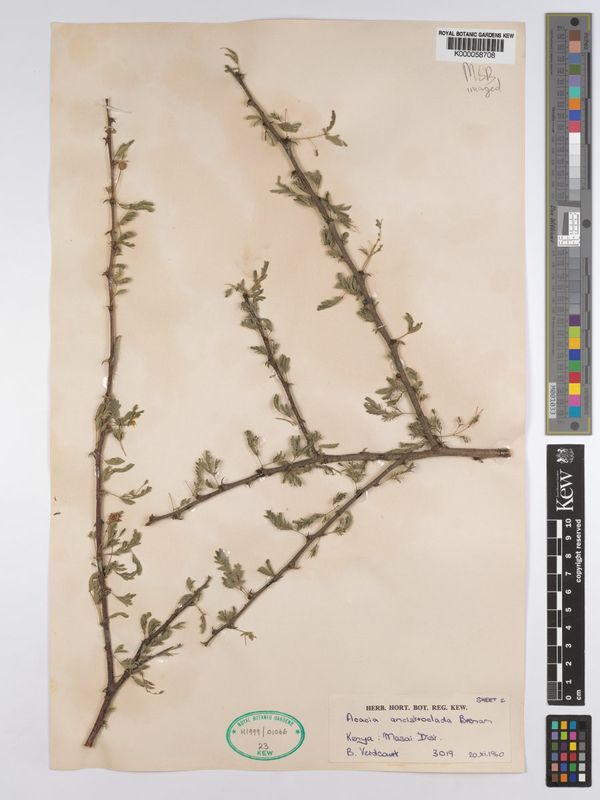

Scientific classification
- Kingdom: Plantae
- Clade: Embryophytes
- Clade: Tracheophytes
- Clade: Angiosperms
- Clade: Eudicots
- Clade: Rosids
- Order: Fabales
- Family: Fabaceae
- Subfamily: Caesalpinioideae
- Clade: Mimosoid clade
- Genus: Vachellia
- Species: V. ancistroclada

Binomial name
- Vachellia ancistroclada (Brenan) Kyal. & Boatwr.

Synonyms
- Acacia ancistroclada Brenan

= Vachellia ancistroclada =

Species of flowering plant

Vachellia ancistroclada is a species of flowering plant in the family Fabaceae. It is a shrub or small tree that is native to Kenya and Tanzania. The species was described in 1959.

== Taxonomy ==
The species was described by John Patrick Micklethwait Brenan in 1959, and placed in the genus Acacia. In 2013, Bruce Kyalangalilwa and James S. Boatwright moved it to the genus Vachellia, as part of a larger taxonomic revision of Acacia.

== Distribution ==
Vachellia ancistroclada is native to the seasonally dry tropical biome of Kenya and Tanzania. The species grows in dry grassland and thornveld, at elevations of 700–1,550 metres (2,300–5,090 ft).

== Description ==
Vachellia ancistroclada is a shrub or tree. It grows 2–8 metres (79–315 in) high. The plant may have several stems. The bark is brown-yellow, and peels off to reveal a green layer underneath. The leaves have one to three pairs of pinnae.

The flowers resemble those of Vachellia seyal.The plant has spines, which resemble those of Vachellia tortilis.
