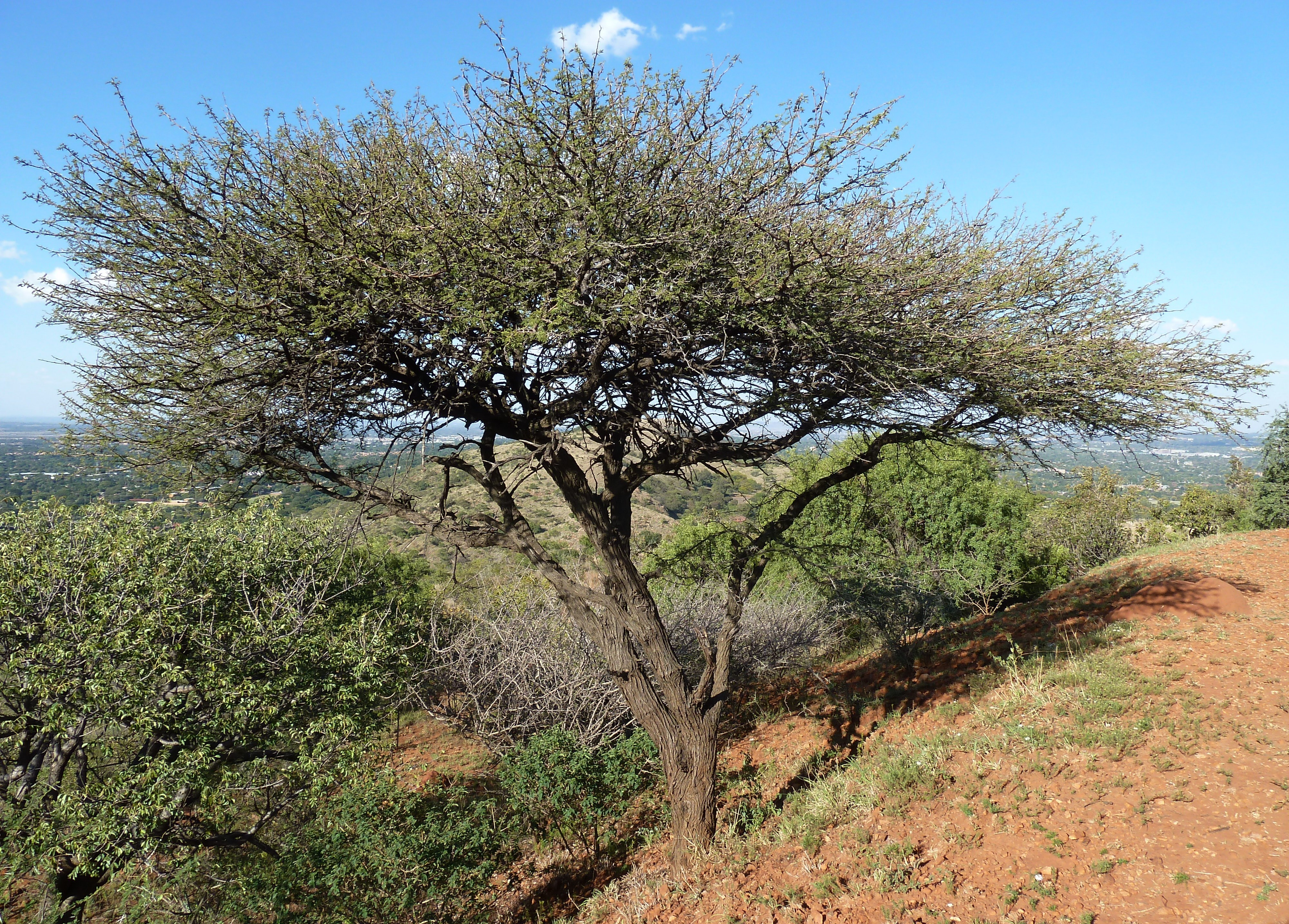

Scientific classification
- Kingdom: Plantae
- Clade: Tracheophytes
- Clade: Angiosperms
- Clade: Eudicots
- Clade: Rosids
- Order: Fabales
- Family: Fabaceae
- Subfamily: Caesalpinioideae
- Clade: Mimosoid clade
- Genus: Vachellia
- Species: V. nilotica
- Subspecies: V. n. subsp. kraussiana

Trinomial name
- Vachellia nilotica subsp. kraussiana (Benth.) Kyal. & Boatwr.

Synonyms
- Acacia benthamiana Rochebr.; Acacia benthamii Rochebr.; Acacia nilotica subsp. kraussiana (Benth.) Brenan; Acacia nilotica subsp. subalata sensu auct.; Acacia subalata sensu auct.

= Vachellia nilotica subsp. kraussiana =

Subspecies of legume

Vachellia nilotica subsp. kraussiana is a perennial tree native to Africa. All examples in southern Africa can be assigned to this race.

== Uses ==
Its uses include chemical products and wood. The bark is used to treat cough by the African Zulu.

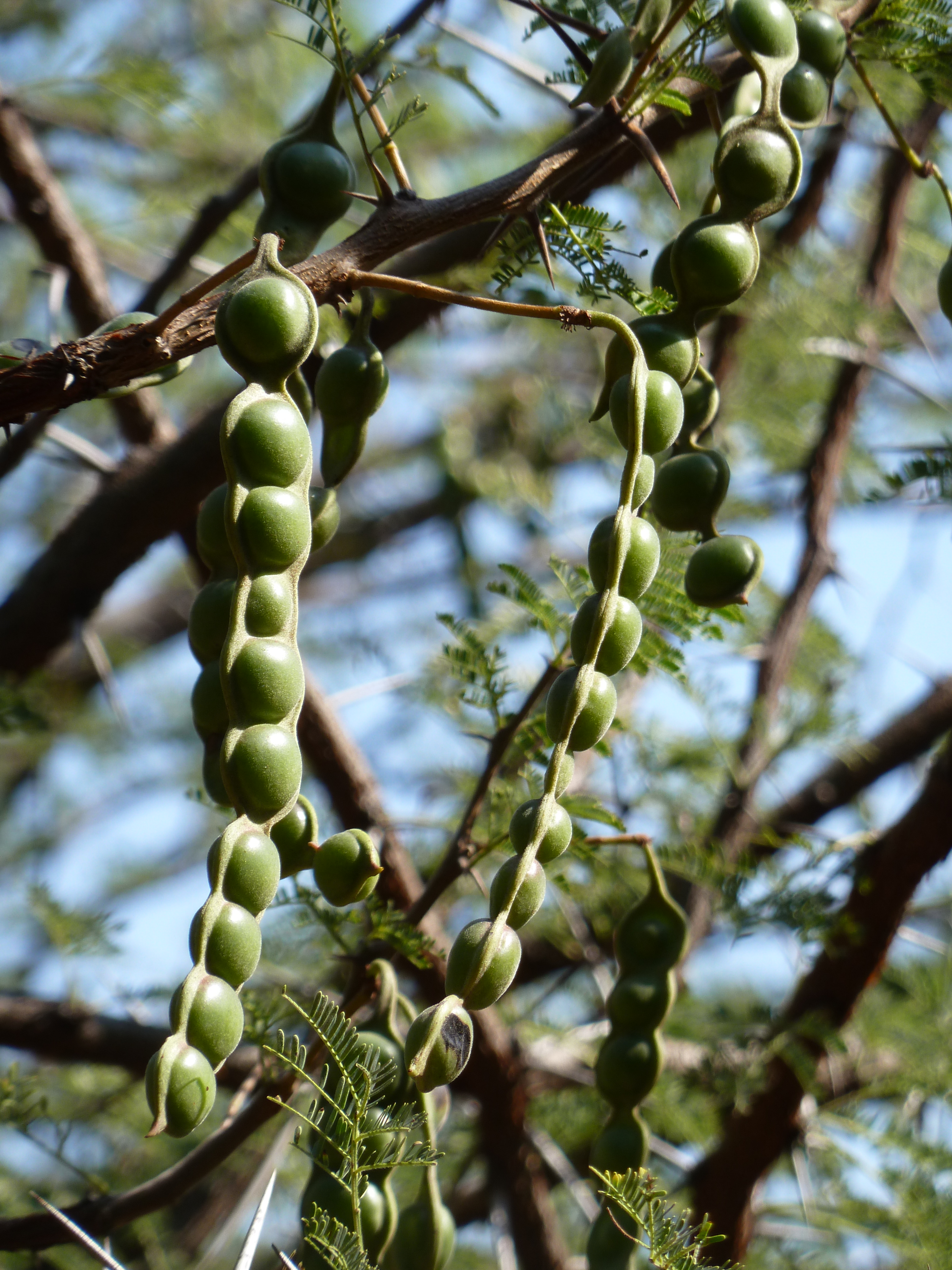
Seed pods
