= Vachellia prasinata =

Conservation status
- Endangered (IUCN 3.1)

Scientific classification
- Kingdom: Plantae
- Clade: Tracheophytes
- Clade: Angiosperms
- Clade: Eudicots
- Clade: Rosids
- Order: Fabales
- Family: Fabaceae
- Subfamily: Caesalpinioideae
- Clade: Mimosoid clade
- Genus: Vachellia
- Species: V. prasinata

Binomial name
- Vachellia prasinata (Hunde) Kyal. & Boatwr.

Synonyms
- Acacia pasinata A. Hunde

Species of legume

Vachellia prasinata (syn. Acacia prasinata) is a species of plant in the family Fabaceae. It is found only in Ethiopia. It is threatened by habitat loss.
