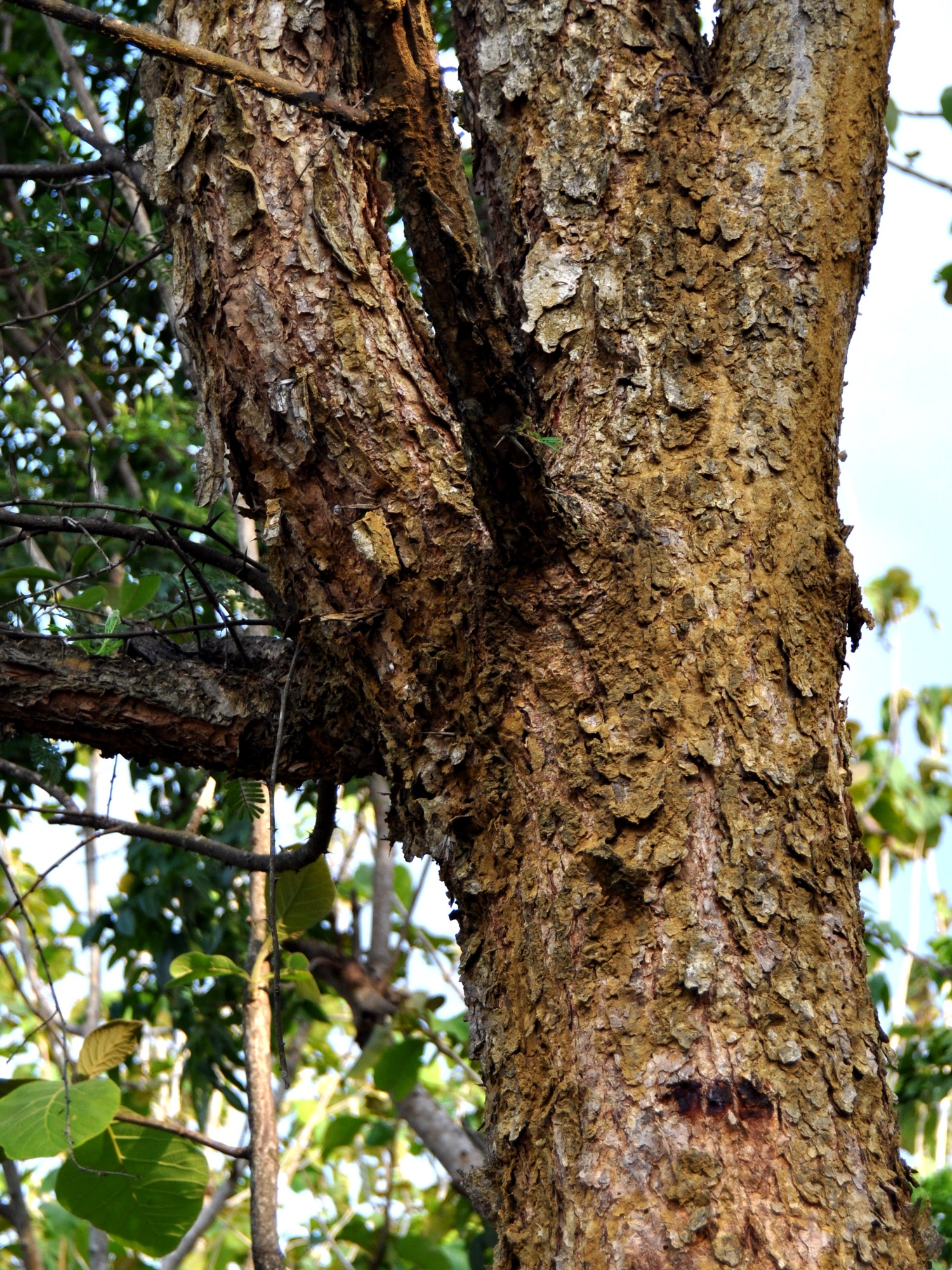

Scientific classification
- Kingdom: Plantae
- Clade: Tracheophytes
- Clade: Angiosperms
- Clade: Eudicots
- Clade: Rosids
- Order: Fabales
- Family: Fabaceae
- Subfamily: Caesalpinioideae
- Clade: Mimosoid clade
- Genus: Vachellia
- Species: V. tomentosa

Binomial name
- Vachellia tomentosa (Rottler) Maslin, Seigler & Ebinger

Synonyms
- Acacia chrysocoma Miq. (1855); Acacia tomentella var. chrysocoma (Miq.) Backer (1908); Acacia tomentosa (Rottler) Willd. (1806); Mimosa cavaty-tooma Roxb. ex DC. in Prodr. 2: 462 (1825); Mimosa kleinii Poir. (1810); Mimosa tomentosa Rottler (1803)

= Vachellia tomentosa =

Species of legume

Vachellia tomentosa is a species of flowering plant in the pea family (Fabaceae). It is a shrub or tree which ranges from India to Indochina, and to Java, the Lesser Sunda Islands, and Maluku.
