= Vachellia anegadensis =

Conservation status
- Endangered (IUCN 3.1)

Scientific classification
- Kingdom: Plantae
- Clade: Tracheophytes
- Clade: Angiosperms
- Clade: Eudicots
- Clade: Rosids
- Order: Fabales
- Family: Fabaceae
- Subfamily: Caesalpinioideae
- Clade: Mimosoid clade
- Genus: Vachellia
- Species: V. anegadensis

Binomial name
- Vachellia anegadensis (Britton) Seigler & Ebinger

Synonyms
- Acacia anegadensis Britton

Species of legume

Vachellia anegadensis, the pokemeboy, is a species of plant in the family Fabaceae. It is found only in the British Virgin Islands. Its natural habitats are subtropical or tropical dry forests, subtropical or tropical dry shrubland, sandy shores, and rural gardens. It is threatened by habitat loss.
