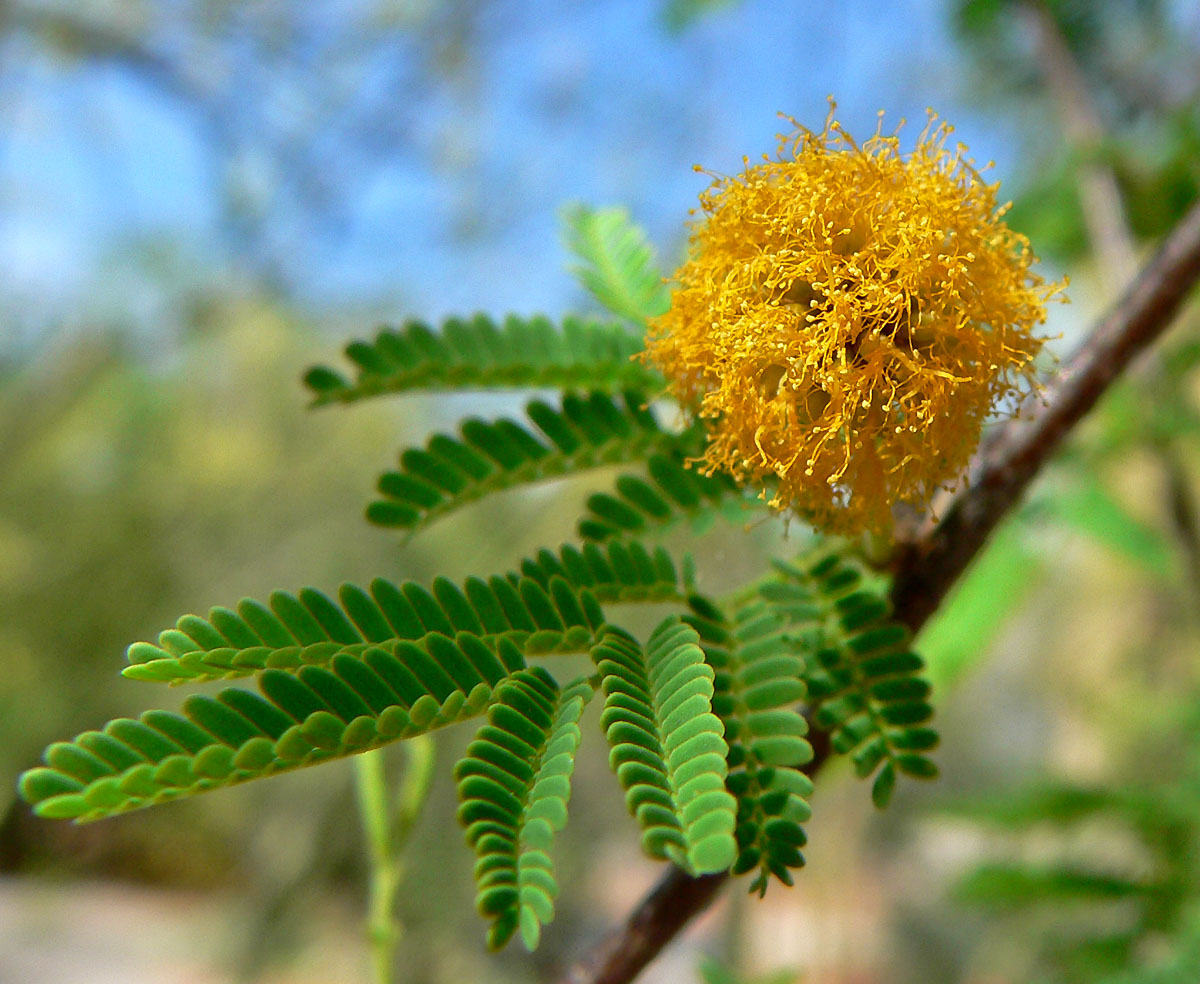
- Vachellia farnesiana

Scientific classification
- Kingdom: Plantae
- Clade: Tracheophytes
- Clade: Angiosperms
- Clade: Eudicots
- Clade: Rosids
- Order: Fabales
- Family: Fabaceae
- Subfamily: Caesalpinioideae
- Clade: Mimosoid clade
- Genus: Vachellia; Wight & Arn.

Type species
- Vachellia farnesiana (L.) Wight & Arn.

Species
- 147; see text.
- The original range of the genus Vachellia. Today it is also found in most Mediterranean countries.

Synonyms
- Acacia subg. Acacia Vassal, nom. illeg.; Acaciopsis Britton & Rose; Aldina E.Mey.; Bahamia Britton & Rose; Delaportea Gagnepain; Farnesia Gasparrini; Feracacia Britton & Rose; Fishlockia Britton & Rose; Gumifera Raf.; Lucaya Britton & Rose; Myrmecodendron Britton & Rose; Nimiria Craib; Pithecodendron Speg.; Poponax Raf.; Protoacacia Mill.; Tauroceras Britton & Rose

= Vachellia =

Vachellia Temporal range: Eocene–Present

Genus of legumes

Vachellia is a genus of flowering plants in the legume family, Fabaceae, commonly known as thorn trees or acacias. It belongs to the subfamily Mimosoideae. Its species were considered members of genus Acacia until 2009. Vachellia can be distinguished from other acacias by its capitate inflorescences and spinescent stipules. Before discovery of the New World, Europeans in the Mediterranean region were familiar with several species of Vachellia, which they used as medicine. European names for them were inherited from the Greeks and Romans.

The wide-ranging genus occurs in a variety of open, tropical to subtropical habitats, and is locally dominant. In parts of Africa, Vachellia species are shaped progressively by grazing animals of increasing size and height, such as gazelle, gerenuk, and giraffe. The genus in Africa has developed thorns to defend against being eaten.

== Nomenclature ==
By 2005, taxonomists had decided that Acacia sensu lato should be split into at least five separate genera. The ICN dictated that under these circumstances, the name of Acacia should remain with the original type, which was Acacia nilotica. However, that year the General Committee of the IBC decided that Acacia should be given a new type (Acacia penninervis) so that the ~920 species of Australian acacias would not need to be renamed Racosperma. This decision was opposed by 54.9% or 247 representatives at its 2005 congress, while 45.1% or 203 votes were cast in favor. However, since a 60% vote was required to override the committee, the decision was carried, and a nom. cons. propositum was listed in Appendix III (p. 286). The 2011 congress voted 373 to 172 to uphold the 2005 decision, which means that the name Acacia and a new type follow the majority of the species in Acacia sensu lato, rather than this genus. The decision remained controversial following the 2011 Congress.

== Description ==
The members of Vachellia are trees or shrubs, sometimes climbing, and are always armed. Younger plants, especially, are armed with spines which are modified stipules, situated near the leaf bases. Some (cf. V. tortilis, Vachellia hebeclada, V. luederitzii and V. reficiens) are also armed with paired, recurved prickles (in addition to the spines). The leaves are alternate and bipinnately arranged, and their pinnae are usually opposite. The racemose inflorescences usually grow from the leaf axils. The yellow or creamy white flowers are produced in spherical heads, or seldom in elongate spikes, which is the general rule in the related genus Senegalia. The flowers are typically bisexual with numerous stamens, but unisexual flowers have been noted in V. nilotica (cf. Sinha, 1971). The calyx and corolla are usually 4 to 5-lobed. Glands are usually present on the rachis and the upper side of the petiole. The seed pod may be straight, curved or curled, and either dehiscent or indehiscent.

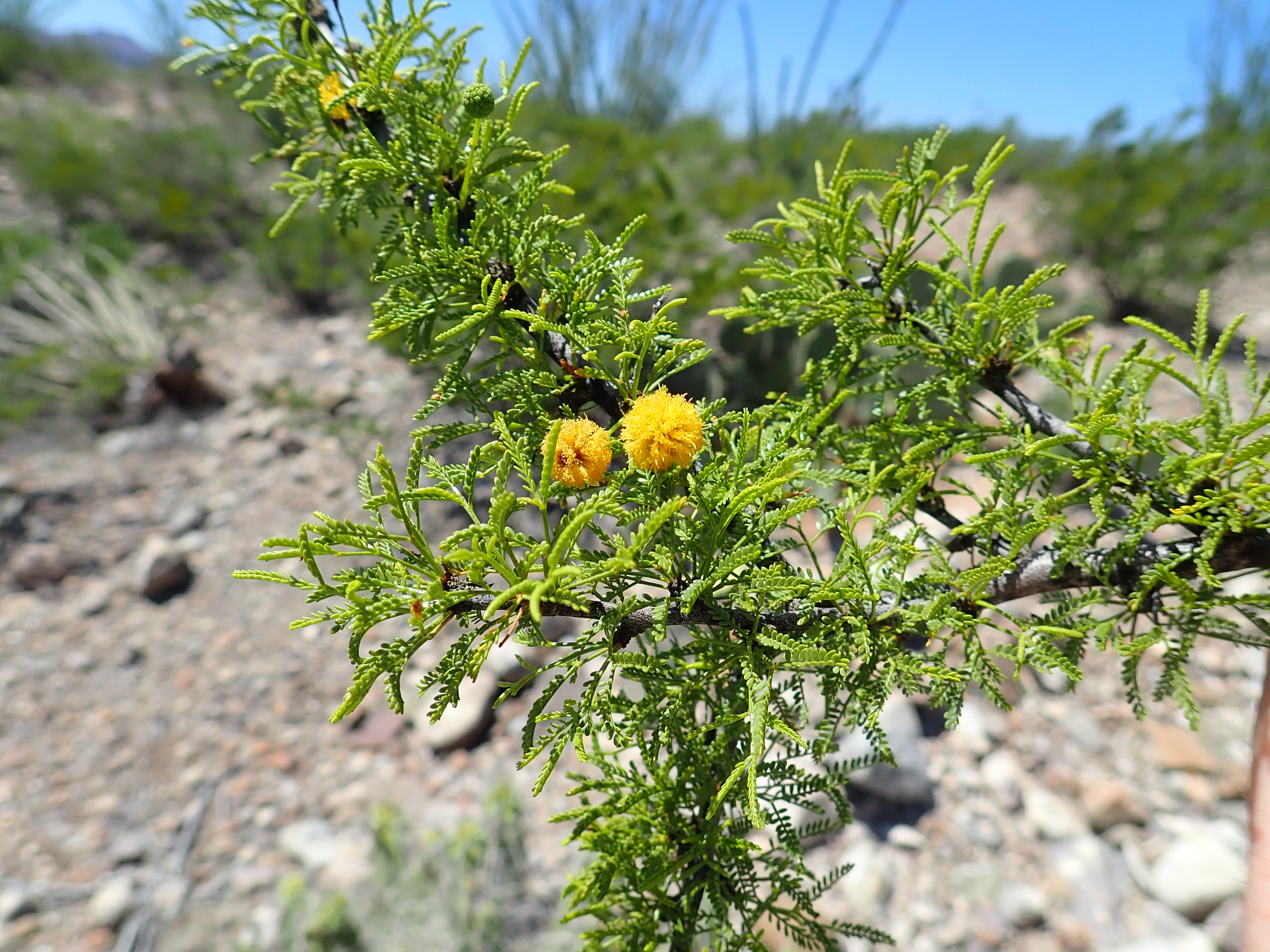
V. vernicosa, or "viscid acacia", in habitat, Far West Texas

=== Habitat and Distribution ===
It is widespread in the Arava desert area shared by Israel and Jordan.They are among the few trees native to the area. It was once also widespread in Tel Aviv, but was replaced by less thorny trees with broader canopies, although a few still do remain. Other species of acacia are native to a variety of locales in the Americas, such as the southeastern USA, Mexico, Central and South America. It is also common in African countries such as South Africa, Angola, and Zambia. It also exists in India and Pakistan.

=== Practical Use, Consumption and Folk Medicine ===
Vachellia seyal, a vachellia which grows in sub-Saharan Africa, secretes gum arabic, which has been used for thousands of years as a binder for paint. Gum arabic also became integral to the printing industry and lithography, and the advent of photography. It is also used in beverage and food domain, preventing crystallization, and in the medical sector, in the production of vitamins and medication. In South Africa, the flowers of Vachellia karoo are essential to honey production, while the medicinal uses of the tree's thorn include eye and cold treatments to plasters and compresses for wounds.

In the Sahelian acacia savanna, the plant provides shelter and cooling cover to both humans and animals, as well as fuel, fiber, and material for fencing. It also balances the soil, and is a food for both wildlife and livestock. The tannins of the tree are used in the local leather tanning industry. In South Africa, where Vachellia karoo is widespread, the tree has been used for making rafts, sewing needles, and housing for royal Zulu women. Naturalists in earlier times even used the trees prickly barbs to fasten insects which they gathered for their collections.

Vachellia tortilis are well known as acacia in Israel, where the seeds are perforated by seed-beetles, which consume the interior of the seed. The seeds then pass through the intestinal tracts of a variety of both domestic and wild animals, such as goats, ibex, gazelles, and hyrax, where they sometimes germinate. While in the digestive system, the beetles often expire. Seeds which endure may germinate if there is sufficient rainfall.

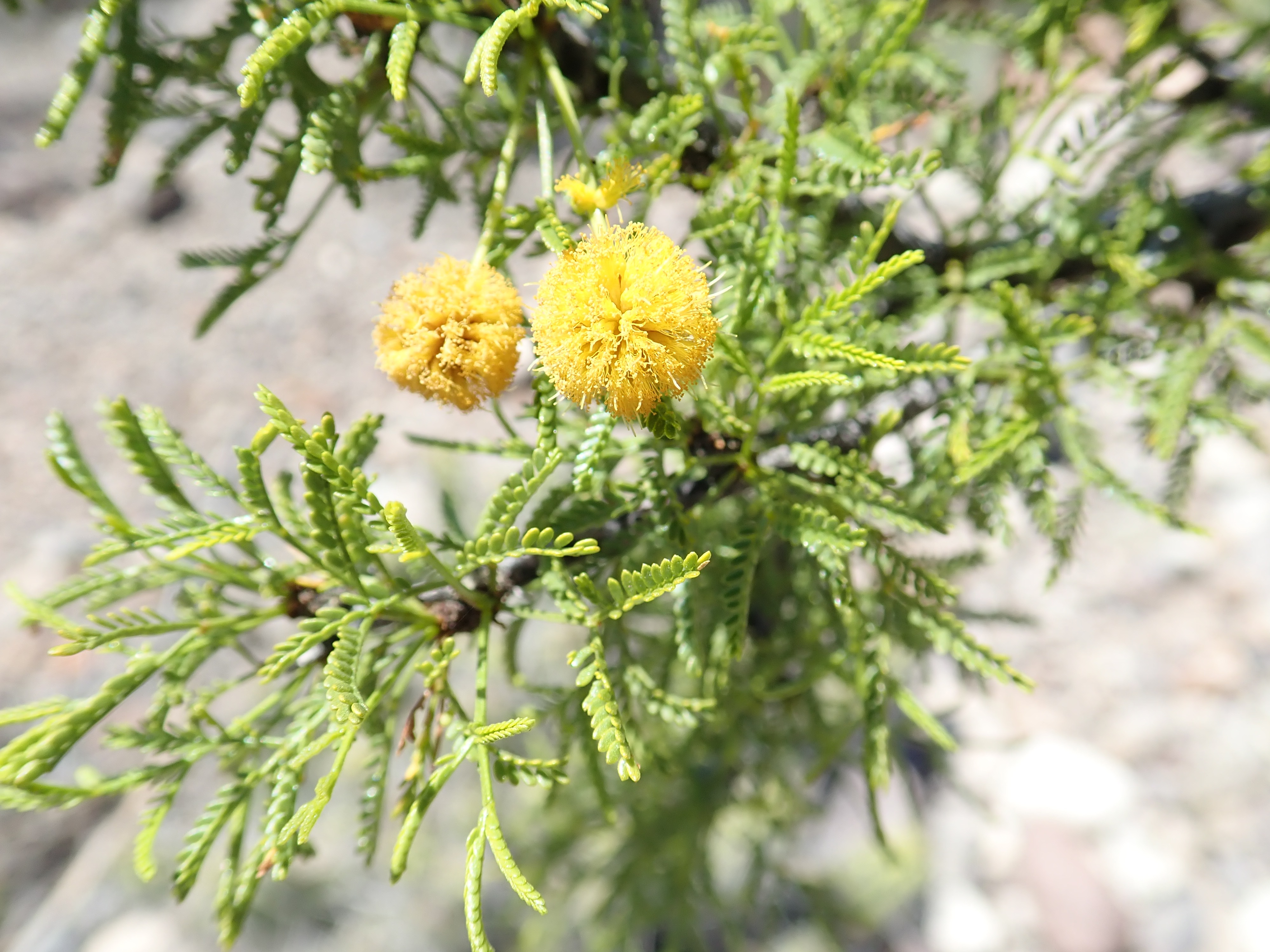
V. vernicosa, detail of inflorescence

== Species list ==
157 species are assigned to Vachellia as of June 2026.

52 are native to the Americas, 83 to Africa, Madagascar and the Mascarene Islands, 32 to Asia and 9 to Australia and the Pacific Islands.

Vachellia comprises the following species:

- Vachellia abyssinica (Hochst. ex. Benth.) Kyal. & Boatwr.—flat top acacia
  - subsp. abyssinica (Hochst. ex. Benth.) Kyal. & Boatwr.
  - subsp. calophylla (Brenan) Kyal. & Boatwr.
- Vachellia acuifera (Benth.) Seigler & Ebinger—Bahama acacia, cassip, pork-and-doughboy, (Bahamas) rosewood
- Vachellia albicorticata (Burkart) Seigler & Ebinger
- Vachellia allenii (D. H. Janzen) Seigler & Ebinger—Allen acacia
- Vachellia amythethophylla (Steud. ex A.Rich.) Kyal. & Boatwr.
- Vachellia ancistroclada (Brenan) Kyal. & Boatwr.
- Vachellia anegadensis (Britton) Seigler & Ebinger—Anegada acacia, blackbrush-wattle, pokemeboy
- Vachellia antunesii (Harms) Kyal. & Boatwr.
- Vachellia arenaria (Schinz) Kyal. & Boatwr.—sand acacia
- Vachellia aroma (Gillies ex Hook. & Arn.) Seigler & Ebinger
  - var. aroma Gillies ex Hook. & Arn.
  - var. huarango Ruíz & J.Macbr.
- Vachellia astringens (Gillies in Hook. et Arn.) Speg.
- Vachellia azuana R.G.García, Clase, Ebinger & Seigler
- Vachellia baessleri Clarke, Siegler & Ebinger
- Vachellia barahonensis (Urb. & Ekman) Seigler & Ebinger
- Vachellia bavazzanoi (Pichi-Sermolli) Kyal. & Boatwr.
- Vachellia belairioides (Urb.) Seigler & Ebinger—Bellair acacia
- Vachellia bellula (Drake) Boatwr.
- Vachellia biaciculata (S. Watson) Seigler & Ebinger
- Vachellia bidwillii (Benth.) Kodela—corkwood wattle, dogwood. "'Waneu', of the aboriginals of Central Queensland; 'Yadthor', of those of the Cloncurry River, Northern Queensland."
- Vachellia bilimekii (J. Macbr.) Seigler & Ebinger
- Vachellia bolei (R.P. Subhedar) Ragupathy, Seigler, Ebinger & Maslin
- Vachellia borleae (Burtt Davy) Kyal. & Boatwr.—sticky acacia, named for the collector Jeanne M. Borle.
- Vachellia brandegeana (I. M. Johnst.) Seigler & Ebinger—Baja California acacia
- Vachellia bravoensis (Isely) Seigler & Ebinger
- Vachellia bucheri (Marie-Victorín) Seigler & Ebinger—Bucher acacia
- Vachellia bullockii (Brenan) Kyal. & Boatwr.
  - var. bullockii (Brenan) Kyal. & Boatwr.
  - var. induta (Brenan) Kyal. & Boatwr.
- Vachellia burttii (Bak. f.) Kyal. & Boatwr.
- Vachellia bussei (Harms ex Sjöstedt) Kyal. & Boatwr.
- Vachellia californica (Brandegee) Seigler & Ebinger
- Vachellia campechiana (Mill.) Seigler & Ebinger—boatthorn acacia, spoon-thorn acacia
  - f. campechiana (Mill.) Seigler & Ebinger
  - f. houghii (Britton & Rose) Seigler & Ebinger
- Vachellia caurina (Barneby & Zanoni) Seigler & Ebinger
- Vachellia caven (Molina) Seigler & Ebinger
  - var. caven (Molina) Seigler & Ebinger
  - var. dehiscens (Ciald.) Seigler & Ebinger
  - var. microcarpa (Speg.) Seigler & Ebinger
  - var. stenocarpa (Speg.) Seigler & Ebinger
- Vachellia cernua (Thulin & Hassan) Kyal. & Boatwr.
- Vachellia chiapensis (Saff.) Seigler & Ebinger—Chiapas acacia
- Vachellia choriophylla (Benth.) Seigler & Ebinger—cinnecord acacia, Florida acacia, (Bahamas) cinnecord
- Vachellia clarksoniana (Pedley) Kodela
- Vachellia collinsii (Saff.) Seigler & Ebinger—Collins acacia
- Vachellia constricta (Benth.) Seigler & Ebinger—Whitethorn acacia, Mescat acacia
- Vachellia cookii (Saff.) Seigler & Ebinger—Cook acacia, cockspur acacia
- Vachellia cornigera (L.) Seigler & Ebinger—bullhorn wattle, bull's-horn acacia, bull-horn thorn, oxhorn acacia
- Vachellia cucuyo (Barneby & Zanoni) Seigler & Ebinger—Cucuyo acacia
- Vachellia cupeyensis (León) García-Beltrán
- Vachellia curvifructa (Burkart) Seigler & Ebinger
- Vachellia daemon (Ekman & Urb.) Seigler & Ebinger—Camagüey acacia
- Vachellia davyi (N.E.Br.) Kyal. & Boatwr.—corky-bark acacia
- Vachellia ditricha (Pedley) Kodela
- Vachellia dolichocephala (Harms) Kyal. & Boatwr.
- Vachellia douglasica (Pedley) Kodela
- Vachellia drepanolobium (Harms ex Sjöstedt) P.J.H. Hurter—whistling thorn
- Vachellia dyeri (P.P.Swartz) Kyal. & Boatwr.
- Vachellia eburnea (L.f.) P. Hurter & Mabb.
- Vachellia ebutsiniorum (P.J.H. Hurter) Kyal. & Boatwr.—Ebutsini acacia
- Vachellia edgeworthii (T.Anders.) Kyal. & Boatwr.
- Vachellia elatior (Brenan) Kyal. & Boatwr.
  - subsp. elatior (Brenan) Kyal. & Boatwr.
  - subsp. turkanae (Brenan) Kyal. & Boatwr.
- Vachellia erioloba (E.Mey.) P.J.H. Hurter—camel thorn (Kameeldoring)
- Vachellia erythrophloea (Brenan) Kyal. & Boatwr.
- Vachellia etbaica (Schweinf.) Kyal. & Boatwr.—savannah thorn
  - subsp. australis (Brenan) Kyal. & Boatwr.
  - subsp. etbaica (Schweinf.) Kyal. & Boatwr.
  - subsp. platycarpa (Brenan) Kyal. & Boatwr.
  - subsp. uncinata (Brenan) Kyal. & Boatwr.
- Vachellia exuvialis (Verdoorn) Kyal. & Boatwr.—flaky-bark acacia
- Vachellia farnesiana (L.) Wight & Arn.—huisache
  - var. farnesiana (L.) Wight & Arn.
  - var. guanacastensis (H.D.Clarke et al.) Wight & Arn.
  - var. minuta (M.E.Jones) Wight & Arn.
  - var. pinetorum (F.J.Herm.) Wight & Arn.—pineland wattle
- Vachellia fischeri (Harms) Kyal. & Boatwr.—flat-topped thorn
- Vachellia flava (Forssk.) Kyal. & Boatwr.
- Vachellia flexuosa (Humb. & Bonpl. ex Willd.) Forero & C.Romero
- Vachellia gentlei (Standley) Seigler & Ebinger—gentle acacia
- Vachellia gerrardi (Benth.) P.J.H. Hurter—red acacia
  - var. calvescens (Brenan) P.J.H. Hurter
  - var. gerrardi (Benth.) P.J.H. Hurter
  - var. latisiliqua (Brenan) P.J.H. Hurter
- Vachellia glandulifera (S. Watson) Seigler & Ebinger
- Vachellia globulifera (Saff.) Seigler & Ebinger—globular acacia
- Vachellia grandicornuta (Gerstner) Seigler & Ebinger—horned-thorn acacia
- Vachellia guanacastensis (Clark, Seigler, & Ebinger) Seigler & Ebinger
- Vachellia gummifera (Willd.) Kyal. & Boatwr.—gum-bearing acacia
- Vachellia haematoxylon (Willd.) Seigler & Ebinger—gray camel thorn, giraffe thorn
- Vachellia harala Thulin & Gifri
- Vachellia harmandiana (Pierre) Maslin, Seigler & Ebinger
- Vachellia hebeclada (DC.) Kyal. & Boatwr.—candle-pod acacia
  - subsp. chobiensis (O.B.Miller) Kyal. & Boatwr.
  - subsp. hebeclada (DC.) Kyal. & Boatwr.
  - subsp. tristis (A.Schreiber) Kyal. & Boatwr.
- Vachellia hindsii (Benth.) Seigler & Ebinger—Hinds acacia
- Vachellia hockii (De Wild.) Seigler & Ebinger
- Vachellia horrida (L.) Kyal. & Boatwr.—long white-galled acacia
  - subsp. benadirensis (Chiov.) Kyal. & Boatwr.
  - subsp. horrida (L.) Kyal. & Boatwr.
- Vachellia hunteri Oliv.
- Vachellia inopinata (Prain) Maslin, Seigler & Ebinger
- Vachellia insulae-iacobi (L. Riley) Seigler & Ebinger
- Vachellia jacquemontii (Benth.) ali—baonḷī, raati-banwali
- Vachellia janzenii (Ebinger & Seigler) Seigler & Ebinger—Janzen acacia
- Vachellia johnwoodii Boulos
- Vachellia karroo (Hayne) Banfi & Galasso—Karroo Bush
- Vachellia kingii (Prain) Maslin, Seigler & Ebinger
- Vachellia kirkii (Oliv.) Kyal. & Boatwr.—flood plain acacia
  - subsp. kirkii (Oliv.) Kyal. & Boatwr.
    - var. kirkii (Oliv.) Kyal. & Boatwr.
    - var. sublaevis (Brenan) Kyal. & Boatwr.
  - subsp. mildbraedii (Harms) Kyal. & Boatwr.
- Vachellia koltermanii R. García, M. Mejía, Ebinger, & Seigler
- Vachellia kosiensis (P.P.Sw. ex Coates Palgr.) Kyal. & Boatwr.—dune acacia, dune sweet-thorn
- Vachellia lahai (Steud. & Hochst. ex. Benth.) Kyal. & Boatwr.—red-thorn acacia
- Vachellia lasiopetala (Oliv.) Kyal. & Boatwr.
- Vachellia latispina (J.E.Burrows & S.M.Burrows) Kyal. & Boatwr.
- Vachellia leucophloea (Roxb.) Maslin, Seigler & Ebinger—pilang
  - var. leucophloea (Roxb.) Maslin, Seigler & Ebinger
  - var. microcephala (Kurz) Maslin, Seigler & Ebinger
- Vachellia leucospira (Brenan) Kyal. & Boatwr.
- Vachellia luederitzii (Engl.) Kyal. & Boatwr.—bastard umbrella thorn
  - var. luederitzii (Engl.) Kyal. & Boatwr.—Kalahari-sand acacia
  - var. retinens (Sim) Kyal. & Boatwr.—balloon-thorn acacia
- Vachellia macracantha (Humb. & Bonpl. ex Willd.) Seigler & Ebinger—longspine acacia, French casha, long-spine acacia, porknut, cambrón, long-spined acacia, (Jamaica) parknut, (Virgin Islands) wild tamarind, (Netherlands Antilles) Creole casha, Spanish casha, steel acacia, (Virgin Islands) stink casha, strink casha
- Vachellia malacocephala (Harms) Kyal. & Boatwr.—black-galled acacia
- Vachellia mayana (Lundell) Seigler & Ebinger—Maya Acacia
- Vachellia mbuluensis (Brenan) Kyal. & Boatwr.—hairy-galled acacia
- Vachellia melanoceras (Beurl.) Seigler & Ebinger—blackthorn acacia, bullhorn acacia
- Vachellia montana (P.P.Swartz) Kyal. & Boatwr.
- Vachellia myaingii (Lace) Maslin, Seigler & Ebinger
- Vachellia myrmecophila (R.Vig.) Boatwr.
- Vachellia natalitia (E.Mey.) Kyal. & Boatwr.—pale-bark acacia, pale-bark sweet thorn
- Vachellia nebrownii (Burtt Davy) Seigler & Ebinger—water acacia, water thorn
- Vachellia negrii (Pichi-Sermolli) Kyal. & Boatwr.
- Vachellia nilotica (L.) P.J.H. Hurter & Mabb.—scented-pod acacia, gum Arabic tree, babul, Amrad gum, thorny mimosa of India
  - subsp. adstringens (Schumach. & Thonn.) P.J.H. Hurter & Mabb.
  - subsp. cupressiformis (J.L.Stewart) P.J.H. Hurter & Mabb.
  - subsp. hemispherica (Ali & Faruqi) P.J.H. Hurter & Mabb.
  - subsp. indica (Benth.) P.J.H. Hurter & Mabb.—Babul, prickly acacia
  - subsp. kraussiana (Benth.) P.J.H. Hurter & Mabb.
  - subsp. leiocarpa (Brenan) P.J.H. Hurter & Mabb.
  - subsp. nilotica (L.) P.J.H. Hurter & Mabb.
  - subsp. subalata (Vatke) P.J.H. Hurter & Mabb.
  - subsp. tomentosa (Benth.) P.J.H. Hurter & Mabb.
- Vachellia oerfota (Forssk) Kyal. & Boatwr.
  - var. brevifolia (Boulos) Kyal. & Boatwr.
  - var. oerfota (Forssk) Kyal. & Boatwr.
- Vachellia origena (Hunde) Kyal. & Boatwr.
- Vachellia ormocarpoides (P.J.H. Hurter) Kyal. & Boatwr.—Leolo thorn
- Vachellia oviedoensis (R. García & M. Mejía) Seigler & Ebinger
- Vachellia pacensis (Rudd & Carter) Seigler & Ebinger
- Vachellia pachyphloia (W. Fitzg.) Kodela
  - subsp. brevipinnula (Tindale & Kodela) Kodela
  - subsp. pachyphloia (W. Fitzg.) Kodela
- Vachellia pallidifolia (Tindale) Kodela
- Vachellia paolii (Chiov.) Kyal. & Boatwr.
  - subsp. paolii (Chiov.) Kyal. & Boatwr.
  - subsp. paucijuga (Brenan) Kyal. & Boatwr.
- Vachellia pennatula (Schltdl. & Cham.) Seigler & Ebinger—feather acacia
  - var. parvicephala Seigler & Ebinger
  - var. pennatula (Schltdl. & Cham.) Seigler & Ebinger
- Vachellia permixta (Burtt Davy) Kyal. & Boatwr.—slender acacia
- Vachellia pilispina (Pichi-Sermolli) Kyal. & Boatwr.—mpande
- Vachellia planifrons Wight & Arn.
- Vachellia polypyrigenes (Greenm.) Seigler & Ebinger
- Vachellia prasinata (Hunde) Kyal. & Boatwr.
- Vachellia pringlei (Rose) Seigler & Ebinger—Pringle acacia
  - var. californica —California Pringle acacia
  - var. pringlei (Rose) Seigler & Ebinger—typical Pringle acacia
- Vachellia pseudofistula (Harms) Kyal. & Boatwr.—ant-galled acacia
- Vachellia qandalensis (Thulin) Kyal. & Boatwr.
- Vachellia quintanilhae (Torre) Kyal. & Boatwr.
- Vachellia reficiens (Wawra) Kyal. & Boatwr.—red-bark acacia
  - subsp. misera (Vatke) Kyal. & Boatwr.
  - subsp. reficiens (Wawra) Kyal. & Boatwr.
- Vachellia rehmanniana (Schinz) Kyal. & Boatwr.—silky acacia
- Vachellia rigidula (Benth.) Seigler & Ebinger—blackbrush acacia, blackbrush
- Vachellia robbertsei (P.P.Swartz) Kyal. & Boatwr.—Sekhukhune acacia
- Vachellia robusta (Burch.) Kyal. & Boatwr.—splendid acacia
  - subsp. clavigera (E.Mey.) Kyal. & Boatwr.—river acacia
  - subsp. robusta (Burch.) Kyal. & Boatwr.—robust acacia
  - subsp. usambarensis (Taub.) Kyal. & Boatwr.
- Vachellia roigii (Léon) Seigler & Ebinger—Roig acacia
- Vachellia rorudiana (Christopherson) Seigler & Ebinger—Galapagos acacia
- Vachellia ruddiae (D. H. Janzen) Seigler & Ebinger—Rudd acacia
- Vachellia schaffneri (S. Watson) Seigler & Ebinger—Schaffner's wattle, twisted acacia
  - var. bravoensis (Isely) Seigler & Ebinger
  - var. schaffneri (S. Watson) Seigler & Ebinger
- Vachellia schottii (Torr.) Seigler & Ebinger—Schott's wattle
- Vachellia sekhukhuniensis (P.J.H. Hurter) Kyal. & Boatwr.—Sekhukhune thorn
- Vachellia seyal (Delile) P.J.H. Hurter—white whistling thorn
  - var. fistula (Schweinf.) P.J.H. Hurter
  - var. seyal (Delile) P.J.H. Hurter
- Vachellia siamensis (Craib) Maslin, Seigler & Ebinger
- Vachellia sieberiana (DC.) Kyal. & Boatwr.—longpod thorn, false paperbark thorn
  - var. sieberiana (DC.) Kyal. & Boatwr.
  - var. villosa (A.Chev.) Kyal. & Boatwr.
  - var. woodii (Burtt Davy) Kyal. & Boatwr.—paperbark acacia, paperbark thorn
- Vachellia sphaerocephala (Schltdl. & Cham.) Seigler & Ebinger—roundhead acacia, bee wattle
- Vachellia stuhlmannii (Taub.) Kyal. & Boatwr.—olive-barked thorn, vlei acacia
- Vachellia suberosa (A. Cunn. ex Benth.) Kodela—corkybark wattle
- Vachellia sutherlandii (F. Muell.) Kodela—corkwood wattle
- Vachellia swazica (Burtt Davy) Kyal. & Boatwr.—Swazi acacia
- Vachellia tenuispina (Verdoorn) Kyal. & Boatwr.—turf acacia
- Vachellia tephrophylla (Thulin) Kyal. & Boatwr.
- Vachellia theronii (P.P.Sw.) Boatwr.—slender mountain thorn
- Vachellia tomentosa (Rottler) Maslin, Seigler & Ebinger—klampis
- Vachellia torrei (Brenan) Kyal. & Boatwr.—Mozambique sticky thorn
- Vachellia tortilis (Forssk.) Galasso & Banfi—umbrella thorn, umbrella acacia
  - subsp. heteracantha (Burch.) Galasso & Banfi
  - subsp. raddiana (Savi) Galasso & Banfi
    - var. pubescens (A.Chev.) Galasso & Banfi
    - var. raddiana (Savi) Galasso & Banfi
  - subsp. spirocarpa (Hochst. ex A.Rich.) Galasso & Banfi
    - var. crinita (Chiov.) Galasso & Banfi
    - var. spirocarpa (Hochst. ex. A.Rich.) Galasso & Banfi
  - subsp. tortilis (Forssk.) Galasso & Banfi
- Vachellia tortuosa (L.) Seigler & Ebinger—twisted acacia, acacia bush, casia, catclaw, Dutch casha, huisachillo, Rio Grande acacia, sweet briar, sweet-briar, wild poponax
- Vachellia valida (Tindale & Kodela) Kodela
- Vachellia vernicosa (Britton & Rose) Seigler & Ebinger—viscid acacia
- Vachellia viguieri (Villiers & Du Puy) Boatwr.
- Vachellia walwalensis (Gilliland) Kyal. & Boatwr.
- Vachellia xanthophloea (Benth.) P.J.H. Hurter—fever tree
- Vachellia yemenensis Boulos
- Vachellia zanzibarica (S.Moore) Kyal. & Boatwr.—coastal whistling thorn
  - var. microphylla (Brenan) Kyal. & Boatwr.
  - var. zanzibarica (S.Moore) Kyal. & Boatwr.
- Vachellia zapatensis (Urb. & Ekman) Seigler & Ebinger

== Hybrids ==
- Vachellia × cedilloi (Rico Arce) Seigler & Ebinger
- Vachellia campechiana × pennatula
- Vachellia erioloba × haematoxylon
- Vachellia × gladiata (Saff.) Seigler & Ebinger
- Vachellia kirkii × seyal
- Vachellia macracantha × pennatula
- Vachellia seyal var. fistula × xanthophloea
- Vachellia × standleyi (Saff.) Seigler & Ebinger
