= Vachellia daemon =

Conservation status
- Endangered (IUCN 2.3)

Scientific classification
- Kingdom: Plantae
- Clade: Tracheophytes
- Clade: Angiosperms
- Clade: Eudicots
- Clade: Rosids
- Order: Fabales
- Family: Fabaceae
- Subfamily: Caesalpinioideae
- Clade: Mimosoid clade
- Genus: Vachellia
- Species: V. daemon

Binomial name
- Vachellia daemon (Ekman & Urb.) Siegler & Ebinger

Synonyms
- Acacia daemon Ekman & Urb.

Species of legume

Vachellia daemon is a species of plant in the family Fabaceae found only in Cuba. It is threatened by habitat loss.
