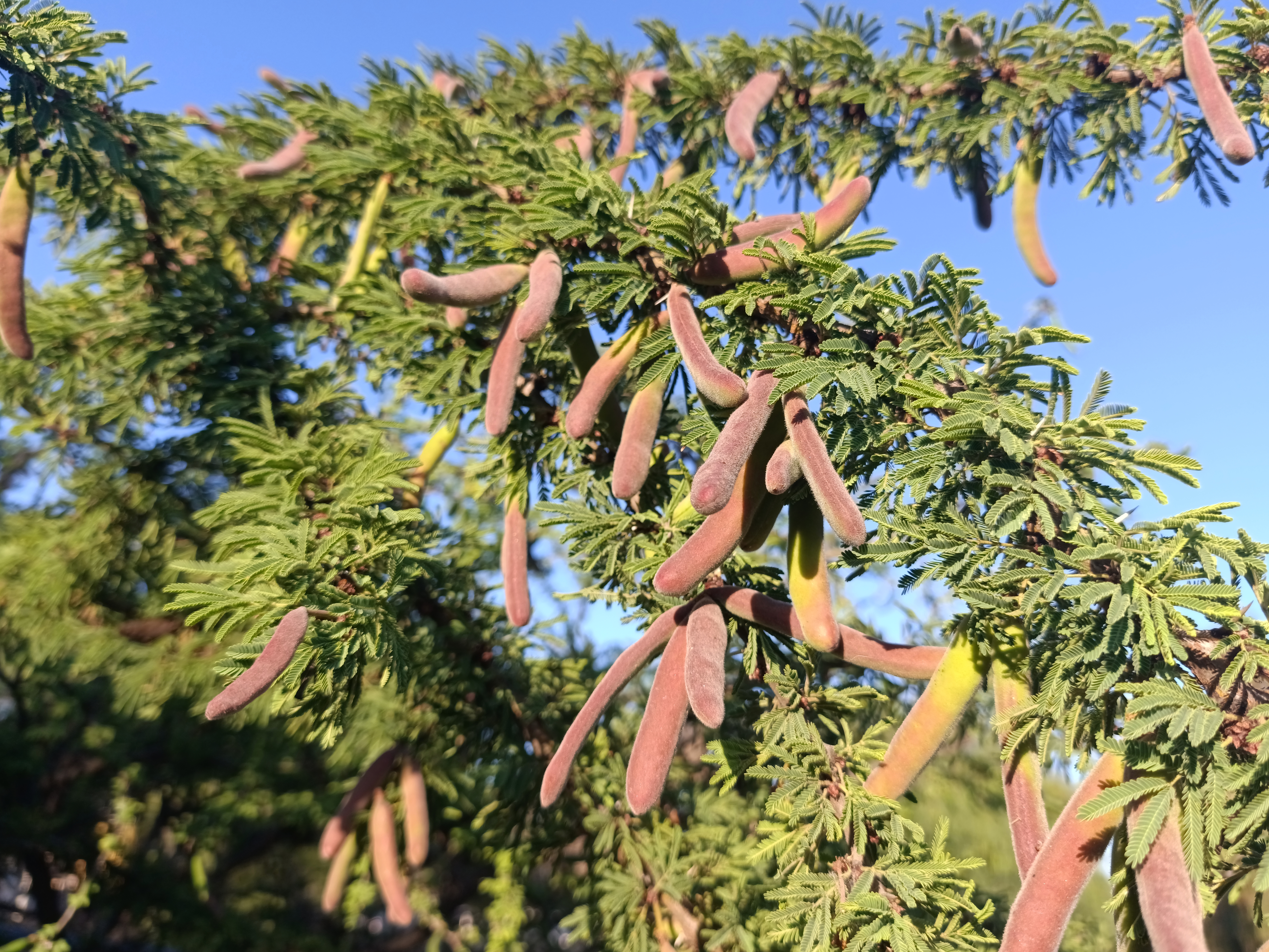
- Vachellia schaffneri fruits

Scientific classification
- Kingdom: Plantae
- Clade: Tracheophytes
- Clade: Angiosperms
- Clade: Eudicots
- Clade: Rosids
- Order: Fabales
- Family: Fabaceae
- Subfamily: Caesalpinioideae
- Clade: Mimosoid clade
- Genus: Vachellia
- Species: V. schaffneri

Binomial name
- Vachellia schaffneri (S. Watson) Seigler & Ebinger

Synonyms
- Acacia schaffneri (S. Watson) F.J. Herm.; Pithecellobium schaffneri S. Watson; Poponax schaffneri (S. Watson) Britton & Rose

= Vachellia schaffneri =

Species of legume

Vachellia schaffneri, the twisted acacia or Schaffner's acacia, is a tree native to Mexico and the southwestern United States (Texas).

== Description ==
This is a thorny tree growing up to 25 feet in height. It has alternate, bipinnately compound leaves that are generally similar to those of other Vachellia species. The plant flowers in spring, with yellow mimosoid flowers. The seedpods are long, fuzzy, ripen in late summer, and are consumed by livestock. They contain many hard, black seeds.

== Uses ==
Vachellia schaffneri wood is used for fuel and fences. The wood makes very good firewood. It is used for cooking.

Vachellia schaffneri trees serve as food for animals. Goats and sheep browse leaves from the tree and eat the fuzzy beans when available late in the summer. Livestock use the trees for shade and shelter.

== Chemical compounds ==
Some chemical compounds found in Vachellia schaffneri are:

- Phenethylamine
- Beta-methyl-phenethylamine
- Tyramine
- Hordenine

The foliage and seeds of Vachellia schaffneri have a protein content of about 11.6%.

== Gallery ==
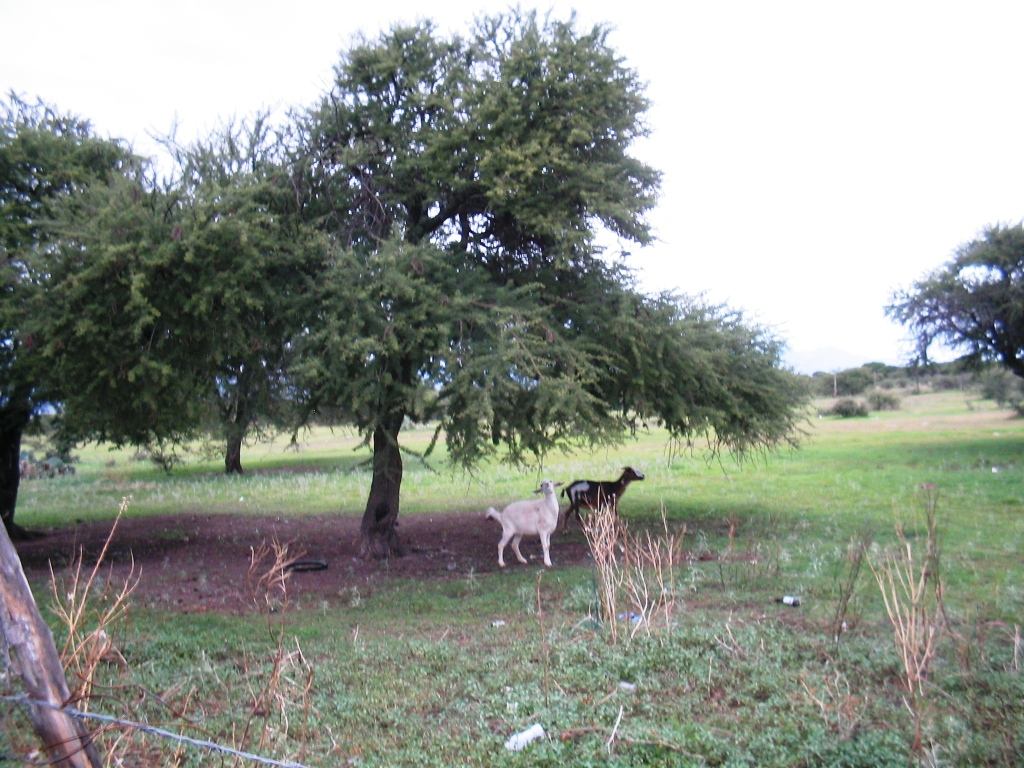
General view

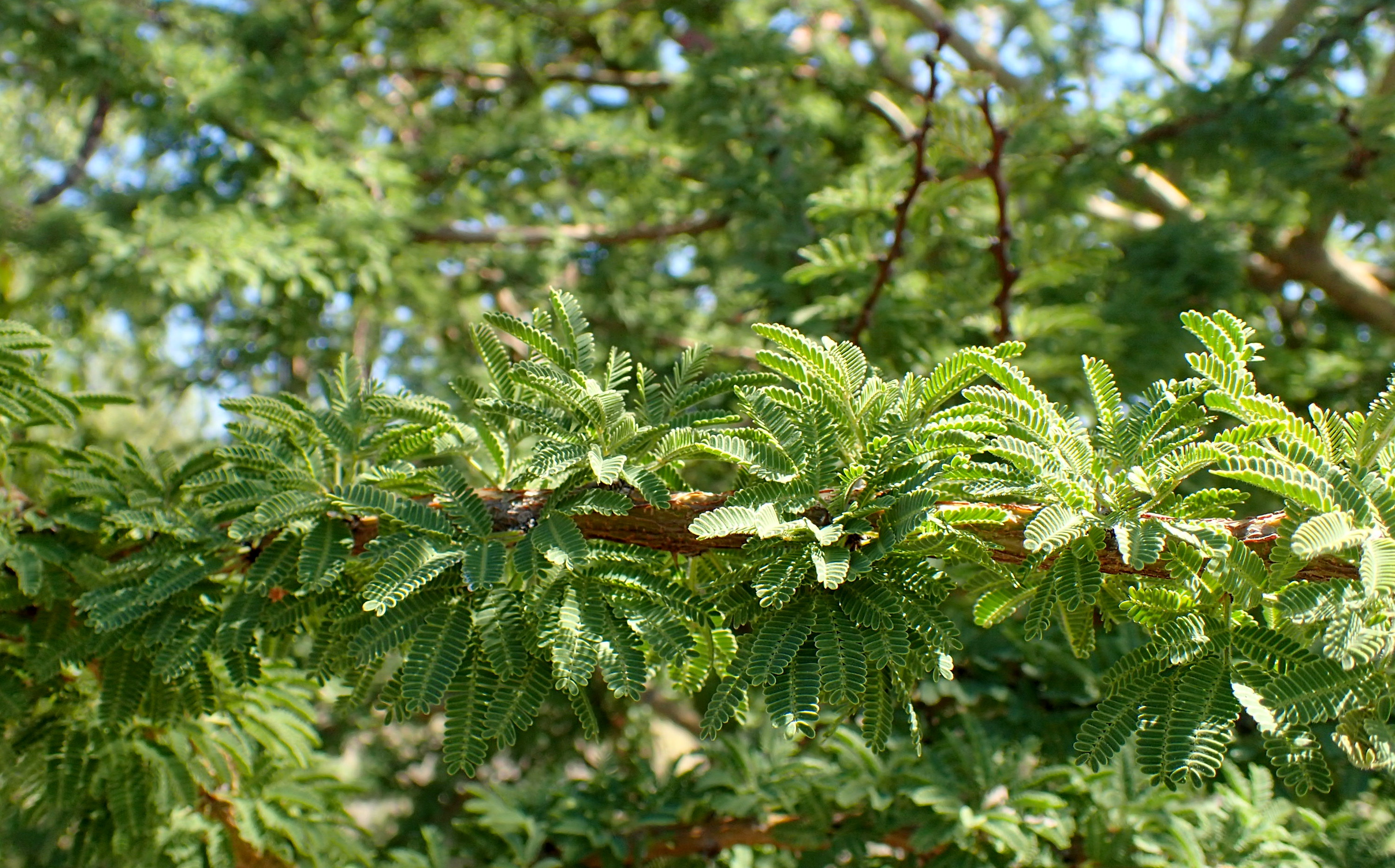
Leaves

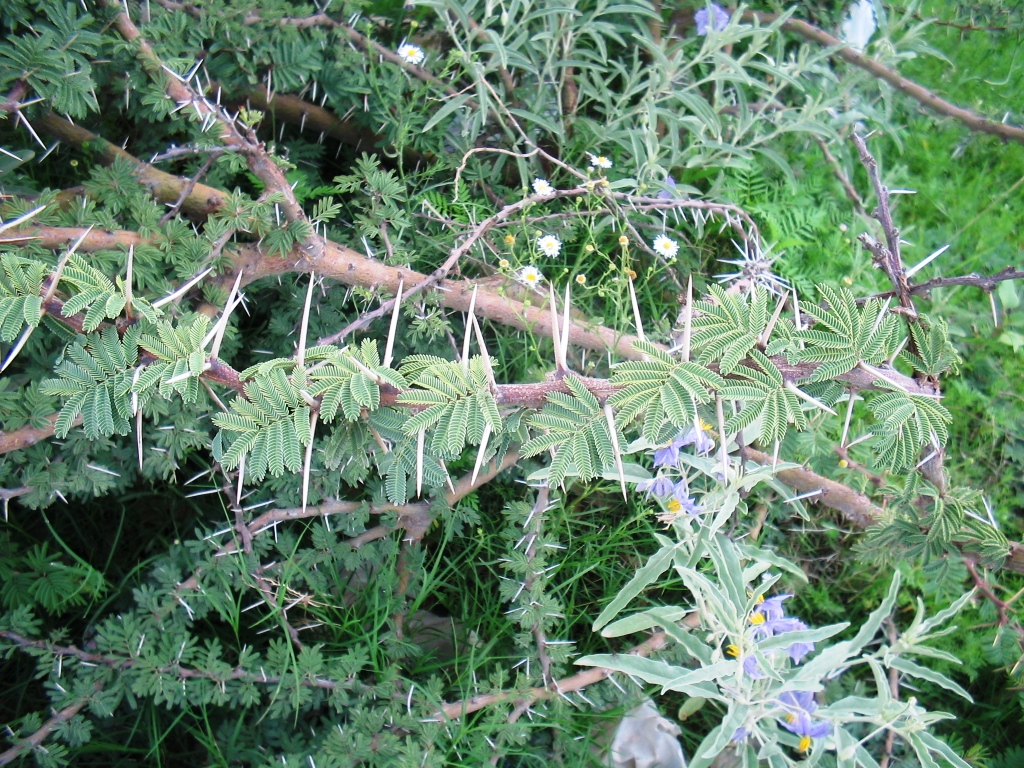
Thorns

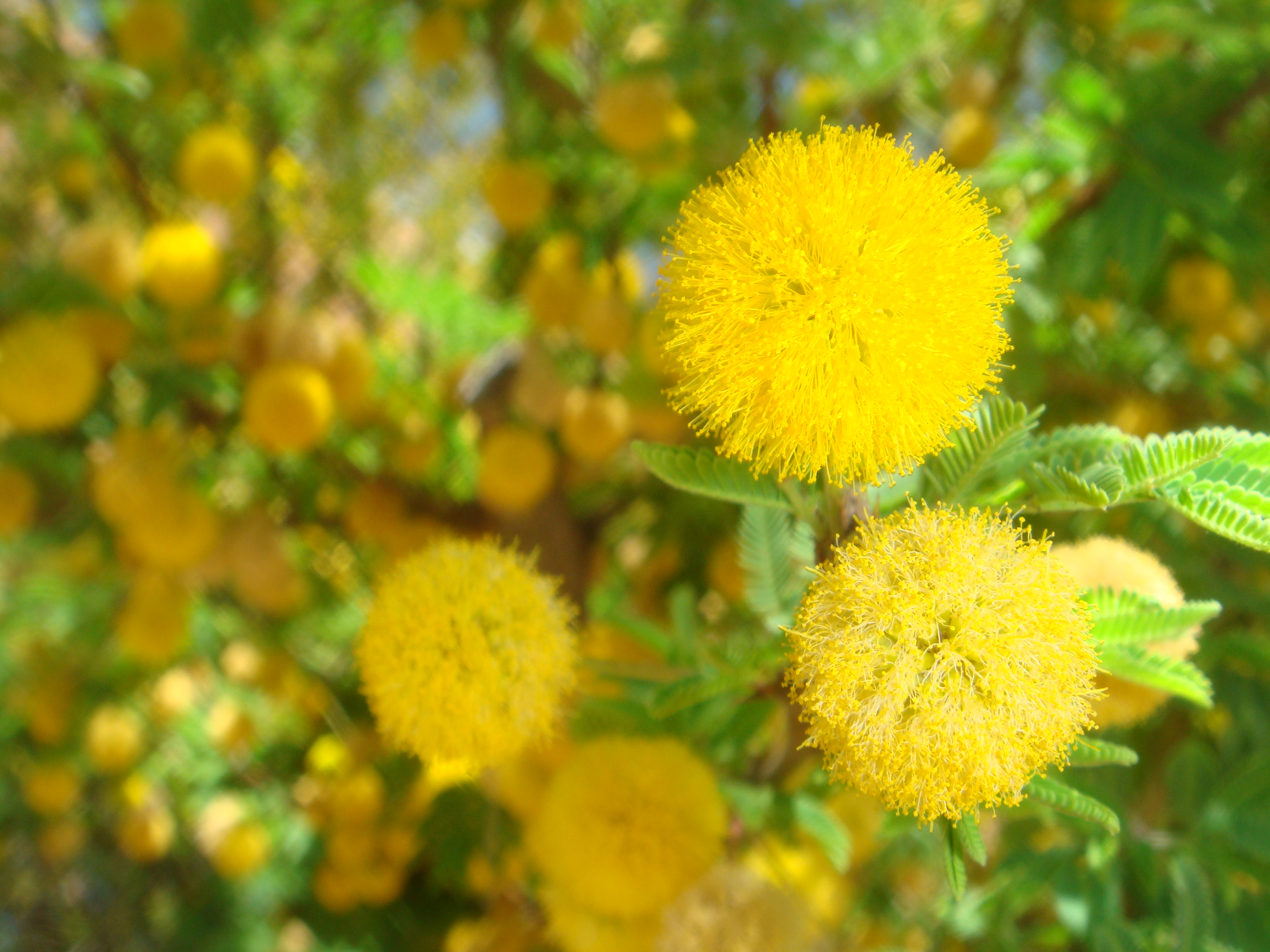
Inflorescence

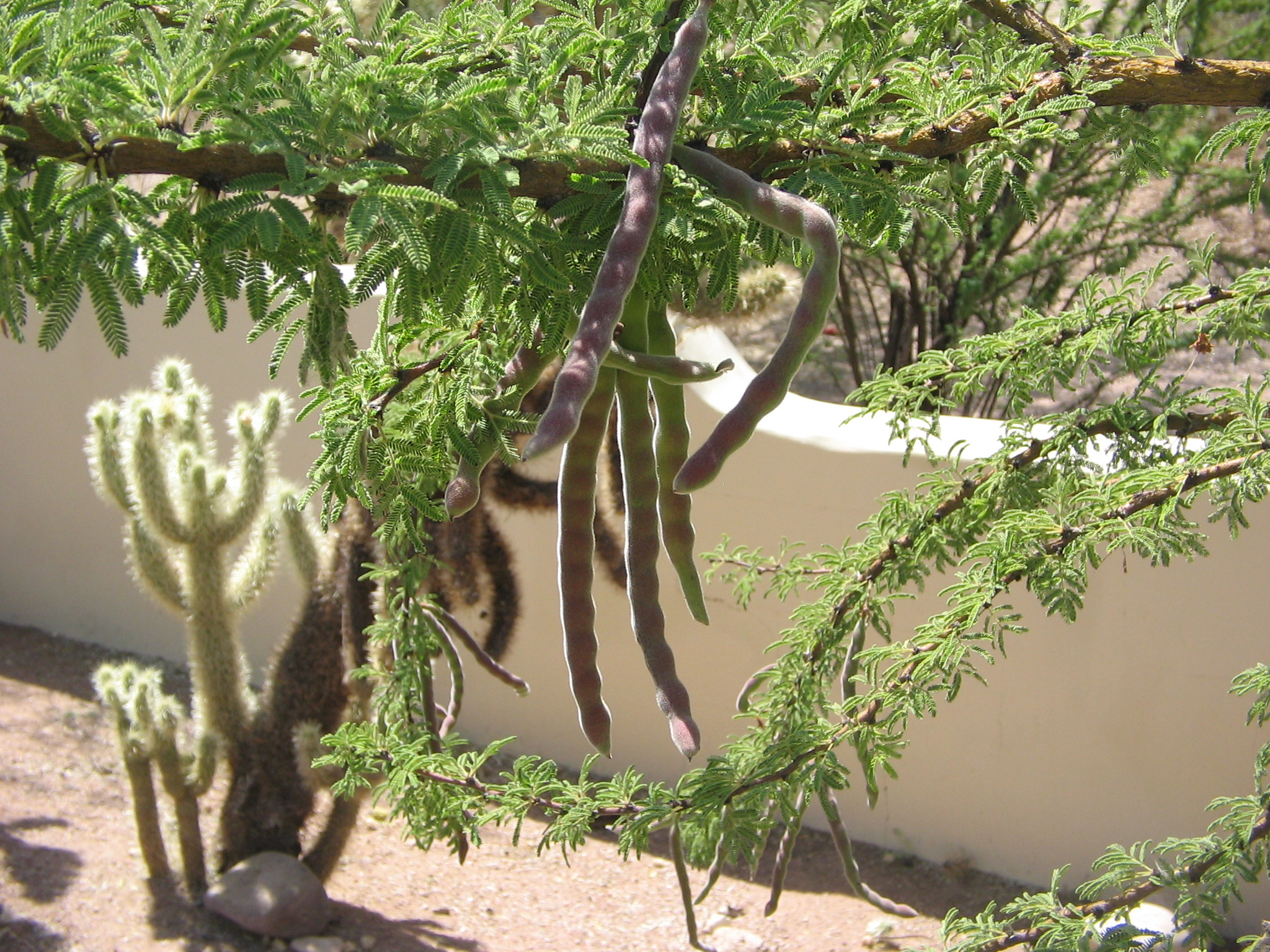
Fruits

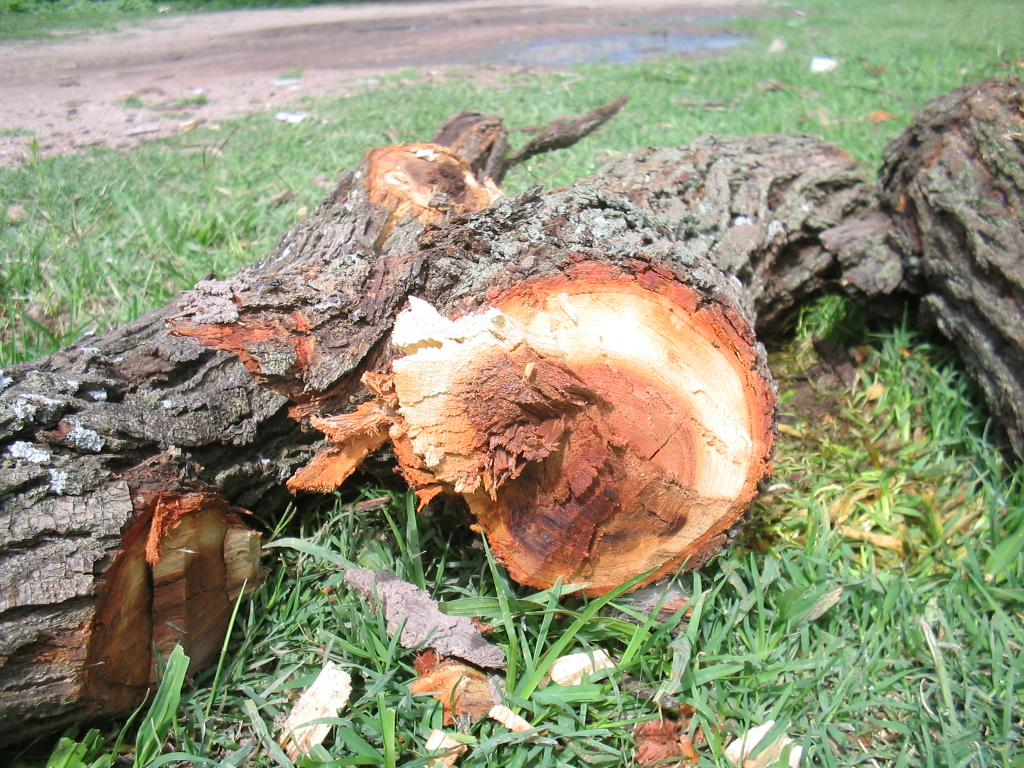
Wood
