= Vachellia zapatensis =

Conservation status
- Endangered (IUCN 2.3)

Scientific classification
- Kingdom: Plantae
- Clade: Tracheophytes
- Clade: Angiosperms
- Clade: Eudicots
- Clade: Rosids
- Order: Fabales
- Family: Fabaceae
- Subfamily: Caesalpinioideae
- Clade: Mimosoid clade
- Genus: Vachellia
- Species: V. zapatensis

Binomial name
- Vachellia zapatensis (Urb. & Ekman) Siegler & Ebinger

Synonyms
- Acacia zapatensis Urb. & Ekman

Species of legume

Vachellia zapatensis is a species of plant in the family Fabaceae endemic to the Zapata Peninsula, Cuba.
