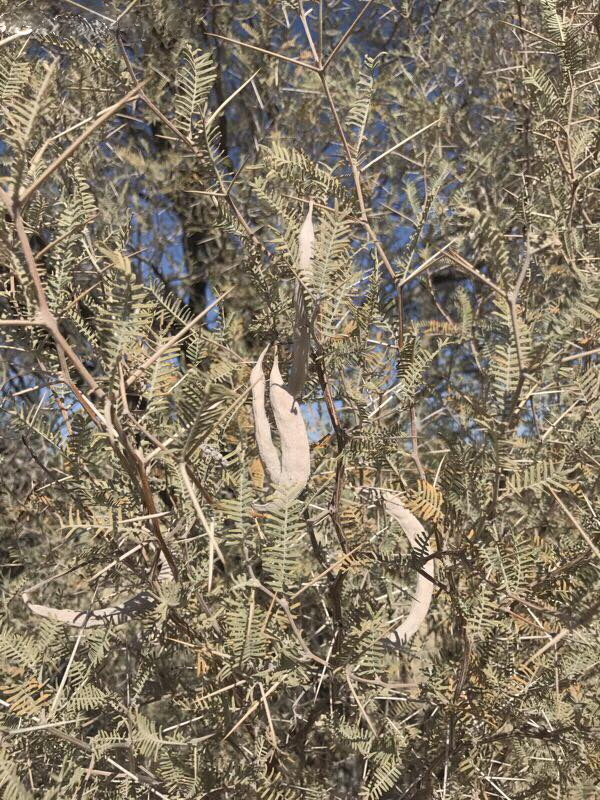
- V. haematoxylon

Scientific classification
- Kingdom: Plantae
- Clade: Embryophytes
- Clade: Tracheophytes
- Clade: Spermatophytes
- Clade: Angiosperms
- Clade: Eudicots
- Clade: Rosids
- Order: Fabales
- Family: Fabaceae
- Subfamily: Caesalpinioideae
- Clade: Mimosoid clade
- Genus: Vachellia
- Species: V. haematoxylon

Binomial name
- Vachellia haematoxylon (Willd.) Seigler & Ebinger

Synonyms
- Acacia haematoxylon Willd.

= Vachellia haematoxylon =

Species of legume

Vachellia haematoxylon (gray camel thorn, giraffe thorn, Afrikaans: vaalkameeldoring, Afrikaans: basterkameeldoring, Afrikaans: basterkameel, Sotho: Mokholo) is a protected tree native to central and southeast Namibia, southwest Botswana and the Northern Cape of South Africa.

== See also ==
- List of Southern African indigenous trees
