= Vachellia natalitia =

Conservation status
- Least Concern (IUCN 3.1)

Scientific classification
- Kingdom: Plantae
- Clade: Embryophytes
- Clade: Tracheophytes
- Clade: Spermatophytes
- Clade: Angiosperms
- Clade: Eudicots
- Clade: Rosids
- Order: Fabales
- Family: Fabaceae
- Subfamily: Caesalpinioideae
- Clade: Mimosoid clade
- Genus: Vachellia
- Species: V. natalitia

Binomial name
- Vachellia natalitia (E.Mey.) Kyal. & Boatwr.

Synonyms
- Acacia natalitia E.Mey.

Species of legume

Vachellia natalitia is a species of flowering plant in the family Fabaceae. It is native to KwaZulu-Natal, and the Northern Provinces.
