= Vachellia cernua =

Conservation status
- Near Threatened (IUCN 2.3)

Scientific classification
- Kingdom: Plantae
- Clade: Tracheophytes
- Clade: Angiosperms
- Clade: Eudicots
- Clade: Rosids
- Order: Fabales
- Family: Fabaceae
- Subfamily: Caesalpinioideae
- Clade: Mimosoid clade
- Genus: Vachellia
- Species: V. cernua

Binomial name
- Vachellia cernua (Thulin & Hassan) Kyal. & Boatwr.

Synonyms
- Acacia cernua Thulin & Hassan

Species of legume

Vachellia cernua is a species of legume in the family Fabaceae. It is found only in Somalia, and is threatened by habitat loss.
