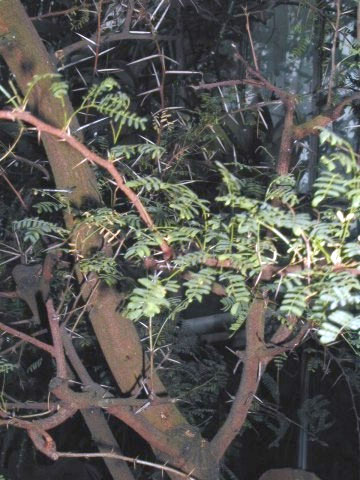

Scientific classification
- Kingdom: Plantae
- Clade: Tracheophytes
- Clade: Angiosperms
- Clade: Eudicots
- Clade: Rosids
- Order: Fabales
- Family: Fabaceae
- Subfamily: Caesalpinioideae
- Clade: Mimosoid clade
- Genus: Vachellia
- Species: V. horrida

Binomial name
- Vachellia horrida (L.) Kyal. & Boatwr.

Subspecies
- Vachellia horrida subsp. benadirensis (Chiov.) Kyal. & Boatwr.; Vachellia horrida subsp. horrida (L.) Kyal. & Boatwr.
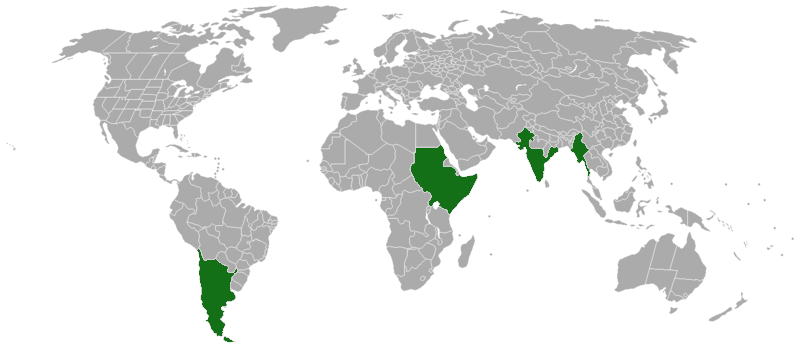
- Range of Vachellia horrida

Synonyms
- Acacia horrida (L.) Willd.; Acacia latronum (L.f.) Willd.; Mimosa horrida L.; Mimosa latronum L. f.

= Vachellia horrida =

Species of legume

Vachellia horrida is a low spreading shrub or sometimes tree native to both the wet and dry scrublands of tropical to subtropical East Africa. Common names for it are Cape gum, Karroo Thorn and dev-babul. It is also found elsewhere in Africa, Asia, India and South America. It frequently has stipular spines 9.5 cm long. V. horrida is an important browse plant in the tropics, particularly during the dry season.

== Uses ==
Vachellia horrida is used as forage for livestock, for its wood and for fuel. Because of its huge thorns, it makes an excellent protective hedge. It used to be the most important tree for the tanning industry in South Africa, but extract from its bark leaves the leather with a rather bad smell. The tree produces good gum, but it is yellowish in color.
