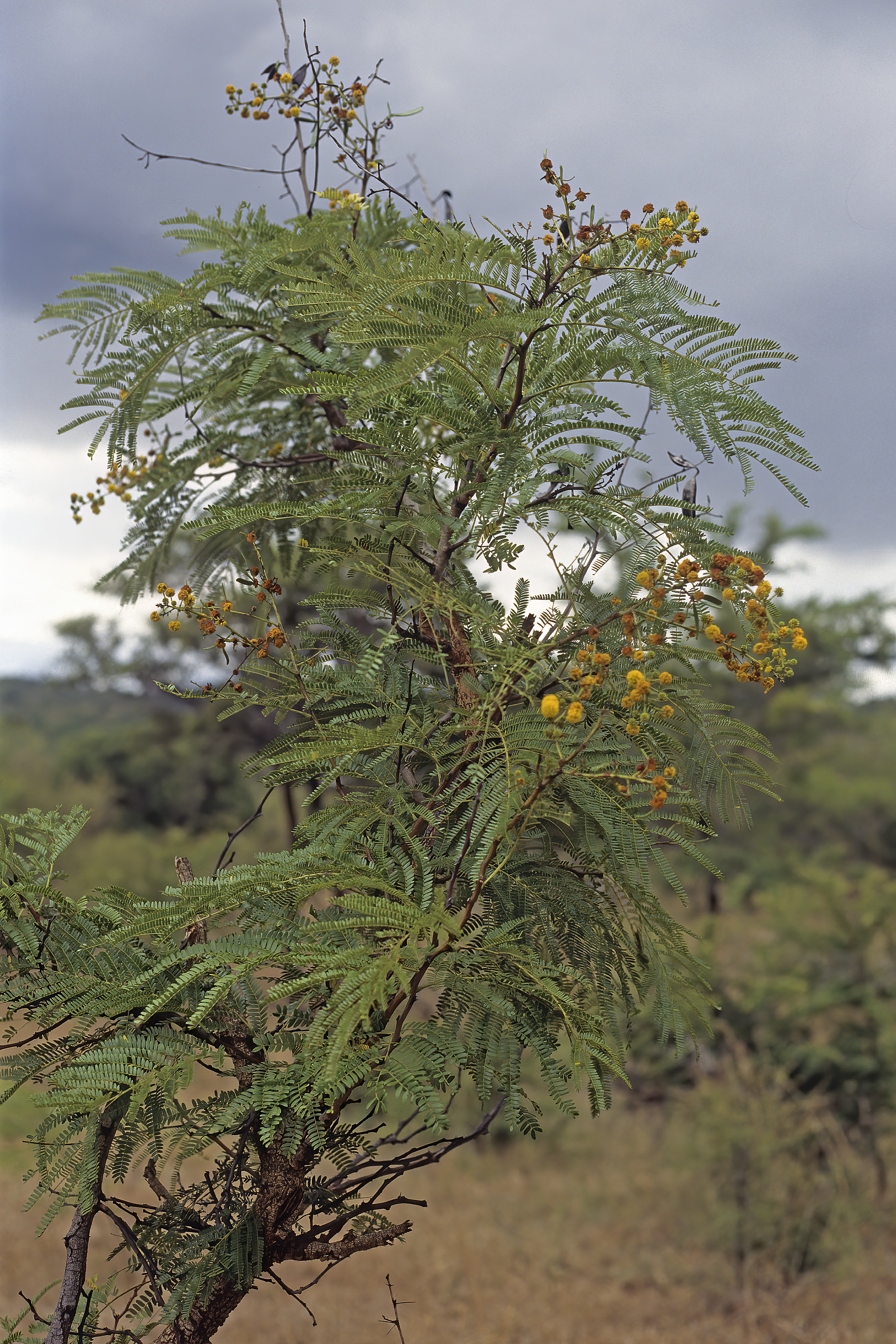

Conservation status
- Least Concern (IUCN 3.1)

Scientific classification
- Kingdom: Plantae
- Clade: Embryophytes
- Clade: Tracheophytes
- Clade: Angiosperms
- Clade: Eudicots
- Clade: Rosids
- Order: Fabales
- Family: Fabaceae
- Subfamily: Caesalpinioideae
- Clade: Mimosoid clade
- Genus: Vachellia
- Species: V. amythethophylla

Binomial name
- Vachellia amythethophylla (Steud. ex A.Rich.) Kyal. & Boatwr.

Synonyms
- Acacia amythethophylla Steud. ex A.Rich.; Acacia buchananii Harms; Acacia dalzielii Craib; Acacia macrothyrsa Harms; Acacia prorsispinula Stapf; Vachellia macrothyrsa (Harms) Kyal. & Boatwr.

= Vachellia amythethophylla =

Species of flowering plant

Vachellia amythethophylla is a species of flowering plant in the family Fabaceae. It is a shrub or tree that is native to a wide region of Africa. The species was described in 1848, and transferred to Vachellia in 2013. The IUCN lists it as of Least Concern.

Vachellia amythethophylla is used in woodwork and medicine.

== Taxonomy ==
Achille Richard published the synonym Acacia amythethophylla in 1848, following an earlier invalid publication by Ernst Gottlieb von Steudel. In 2013, Bruce Kyalangalilwa and James S. Boatwright transferred the species from Acacia to the newly recognised Vachellia.

According to a 2013 phylogenetic analysis, Vachellia amythethophylla is closely related to Vachellia gummifera, Vachellia davyi, and Vachellia arenaria.

== Distribution ==
Vachellia amythethophylla is native to seasonally dry tropical regions of Africa (Angola, Benin, Burkina Faso, Cameroon, Chad, Democratic Republic of the Congo, Eritrea, Ethiopia, Ghana, Ivory Coast, Kenya, Malawi, Mali, Mozambique, Niger, Nigeria, Sudan, South Sudan, Tanzania, Uganda, Zambia, and Zimbabwe). It grows in wooded grasslands and deciduous woodlands, at elevations of 600–2,000 metres (2,000–6,600 ft).

== Description ==
Vachellia amythethophylla is a shrub or tree.

== Uses ==
The wood of Vachellia amythethophylla is used to make charcoal, and in carving, woodturning, and inlay. The roots are used to treat diarrhoea.

== Conservation ==
In 2020, the IUCN assessed Vachellia amythethophylla as of Least Concern. The population is large, widespread, and faces no major threats.
