= Jeanne M. Borle =

Swiss missionary and collector of botanicals (1880 - ca. 1979)

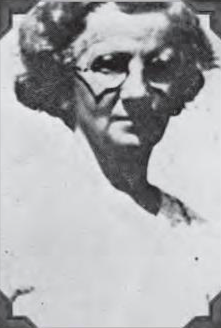
- Borle in 1930
- Born: Jeanne Muhlemann; 1880; Saint-Imier, Bernese Jura, Switzerland
- Died: c. 1979 (aged c. 99); Elim, Western Cape, South Africa
- Spouse: James Borle (died 1918)
- Scientific career
- Fields: Botanical collector and missionary

Jeanne M. Borle (occasionally known as Johanna Louise Borle, Lydia Borle, or by the honorific Kokwana; 1880 - c. 1979) was a Swiss missionary and collector of botanicals. Born in Saint-Imier, Bernese Jura, Switzerland with the maiden name Mühlemann, she married the missionary physician Dr. James Borle. Along with other Swiss missionaries that were heading to South Africa at the time, the Borles travelled to Elim, Western Cape to assist in the running of a hospital there. After her husband’s death in 1918 during the Great Influenza pandemic, she worked at the American Methodist Mission (now the Chicuque Rural Hospital) in Portuguese Mozambique, and lived in the Polana district of Maputo.

It is around this time, after the death of her husband, and on the eastern coast of southern Africa, that Borle appears to have developed an interest in plant collecting. She wrote to the National Herbarium of Pretoria in April 1919, from Maputo, requesting a pamphlet with information about collecting and drying flowers, and soon was sending many specimens that she had collected to the Pretoria herbarium.

At first, she collected the plants she found in and around Maputo, but soon started to send specimens from Bulawayo in Zimbabwe, Sesheke in Zambia, Grootfontein in Namibia, and Gqeberha in South Africa. She was the first collector to send specimens from western Zambia to the Pretoria herbarium. The plants that she collected were then distributed from Pretoria to other herbaria, including Meise, Coimbra, The New York Botanical Garden, Uppsala, University of Vienna and the National Herbarium of Victoria Royal Botanic Gardens Victoria.

Borle returned to the Elim mission in the 1950s, where she continued to work until the age of 97. She died aged 99, in Elim.

== Botanical legacy ==
The plant Vachellia borleae (Burtt Davy) Kyal. & Boatwr (syn. Acacia borleae Burtt Davy) was named in her honour, after a specimen that she had collected in 1920 in Maputo.

Borle also collected the type specimens of Hymenocardia capensis, Barleria lateralis, and Acacia chariessa.
