= Vachellia bucheri =

Conservation status
- Endangered (IUCN 2.3)

Scientific classification
- Kingdom: Plantae
- Clade: Tracheophytes
- Clade: Angiosperms
- Clade: Eudicots
- Clade: Rosids
- Order: Fabales
- Family: Fabaceae
- Subfamily: Caesalpinioideae
- Clade: Mimosoid clade
- Genus: Vachellia
- Species: V. bucheri

Binomial name
- Vachellia bucheri (Marie-Victorín) Siegler & Ebinger

Synonyms
- Acacia bucheri Marie Victorín

Species of legume

Vachellia bucheri is a species of legume in the family Fabaceae found only in Cuba.
