= Vachellia kirkii =

Scientific classification
- Kingdom: Plantae
- Clade: Tracheophytes
- Clade: Angiosperms
- Clade: Eudicots
- Clade: Rosids
- Order: Fabales
- Family: Fabaceae
- Subfamily: Caesalpinioideae
- Clade: Mimosoid clade
- Genus: Vachellia
- Species: V. kirkii

Binomial name
- Vachellia kirkii (Oliv.) Kyal. & Boatwr.

Synonyms
- Acacia kirkii Oliv.

Species of plant

Vachellia kirkii, formerly classified as Acacia kirkii, is a tree species native to tropical Africa, but now attributed to the genus Vachellia, It is commonly known as the flood plain acacia.

This species is a multi-trunked shrub or tree with a spreading, flat-topped crown. it typically grows from 2.5 to 15 meters in height, but can occasionally reach up to 18 meters.

Vachellia kirkii is distributed across tropical Africa, from Guinea and Mali to the Democratic Republic Congo, Uganda, Kenya, Burundi, Rwanda, Tanzania, Angola, Zambia, and Zimbabwe.

It thrives in various habitats including woodlands, savannas, and mixed scrublands, often in seasonally-flooded areas near rivers and lakes. These environment includes groundwater forests, swamp forests, and flooded savannas, on nutrient-rich silty and clay soils. The is found at elevations ranging from sea level to 1,980 metres.

The species is named in honor of John Kirk, who accompanied David Livingstone on his Zambezi expedition in 1858.
