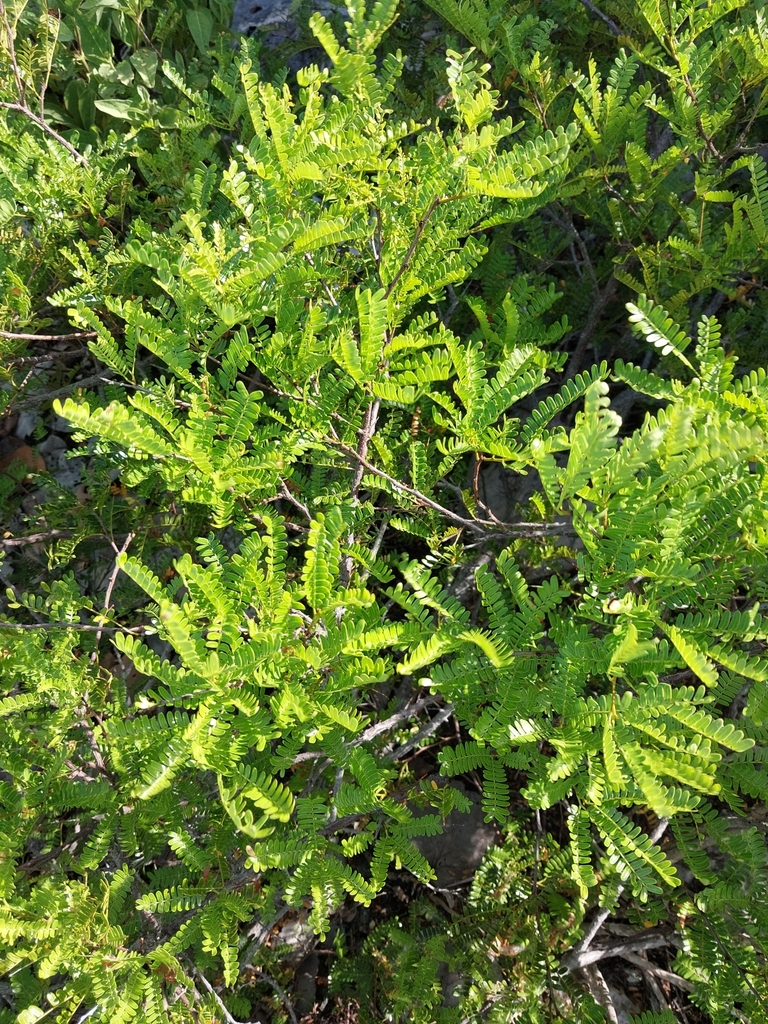

Conservation status
- Least Concern (IUCN 3.1)

Scientific classification
- Kingdom: Plantae
- Clade: Embryophytes
- Clade: Tracheophytes
- Clade: Spermatophytes
- Clade: Angiosperms
- Clade: Eudicots
- Clade: Rosids
- Order: Fabales
- Family: Fabaceae
- Subfamily: Caesalpinioideae
- Clade: Mimosoid clade
- Genus: Vachellia
- Species: V. acuifera

Binomial name
- Vachellia acuifera (Benth.) Seigler & Ebinger

Synonyms
- Acacia acuifera Benth.; Bahamia acuifera (Benth.) Britton & Rose; Cojoba micrantha (Benth.) Britton & Rose; Feuilleea micrantha (Benth.) Kuntze; Pithecellobium micranthum Benth.

= Vachellia acuifera =

Species of flowering plant

Vachellia acuifera is a species of flowering plant in the family Fabaceae. It is a shrub or tree native to the Caribbean. The species was described in 1842, and is listed as of Least Concern by the International Union for Conservation of Nature.

== Taxonomy ==
The species was first described in 1842, by George Bentham, as Acacia acuifera. In 2006, it was moved to the genus Vachellia.

== Distribution ==
Vachellia acuifera is native to the seasonally dry tropical biome of the Bahamas, Cuba, and the Turks and Caicos Islands. It may be present in the Dominican Republic, though this is based on a single specimen. The species' estimated extent of occurrence is 125,684 square kilometres (48,527 sq mi).

The species occurs in dry, subtropical, broadleaf evergreen forests, pine woodlands, shrublands, and at the edges of freshwater wetlands.

== Description ==
Vachellia acuifera is a shrub or small tree.

== Conservation ==
In 2021, the IUCN assessed Vachellia acuifera as of Least Concern. The population is stable. Invasive species, human development, and climate change have been identified as threats to the species.
