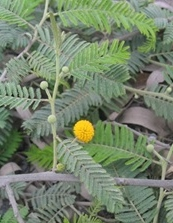

Conservation status
- Least Concern (IUCN 3.1)

Scientific classification
- Kingdom: Plantae
- Clade: Tracheophytes
- Clade: Angiosperms
- Clade: Eudicots
- Clade: Rosids
- Order: Fabales
- Family: Fabaceae
- Subfamily: Caesalpinioideae
- Clade: Mimosoid clade
- Genus: Vachellia
- Species: V. macracantha

Binomial name
- Vachellia macracantha (Humb. & Bonpl. ex Willd.) Seigler & Ebinger

Synonyms
- List: Acacia cowellii (Britton & Rose) León; Acacia flexuosa var. ambigua DC.; Acacia flexuosa var. lasiocarpa Griseb.; Acacia humboldtii Desv.; Acacia lutea (Mill.) Britton; Acacia macracantha Humb. & Bonpl. ex Willd.; Acacia macracantha var. glabra Kitan.; Acacia macracantha var. glabrescens Griseb.; Acacia macracanthoides Bertero ex DC.; Acacia microcephala Macfad.; Acacia obtusa Humb. & Bonpl. ex Willd.; Acacia pellacantha Vogel; Acacia platyacantha Schltdl.; Acacia punctata Humb. & Bonpl. ex Willd.; Acacia subinermis Bertero ex DC.; Mimosa atomaria Poir.; Mimosa lutea Mill.; Mimosa macracantha (Humb. & Bonpl. ex Willd.) Poir.; Mimosa obtusa Poir.; Mimosa pellacantha Meyen; Poponax cowellii Britton & Rose; Poponax lutea (Mill.) Britton & Rose; Poponax macracantha (Humb. & Bonpl. ex Willd.) Killip; Poponax macracanthoides (Bertero ex DC.) Britton & Rose; Vachellia lutea (Mill.) Speg.

= Vachellia macracantha =

Species of legume

Vachellia macracantha is a species of tree in the family Fabaceae. Its native range spans from southern Florida to South America.
