= Vachellia belairioides =

Conservation status
- Critically Endangered (IUCN 2.3)

Scientific classification
- Kingdom: Plantae
- Clade: Tracheophytes
- Clade: Angiosperms
- Clade: Eudicots
- Clade: Rosids
- Order: Fabales
- Family: Fabaceae
- Subfamily: Caesalpinioideae
- Clade: Mimosoid clade
- Genus: Vachellia
- Species: V. belairioides

Binomial name
- Vachellia belairioides (Urb.) Seigler & Ebinger

Synonyms
- Acacia belairioides Urb.

Species of legume

Vachellia belairioides is a species of legume in the family Fabaceae. It is found only in Cuba, confined to Holguín Province in northeastern Cuba. It is threatened by habitat loss.
