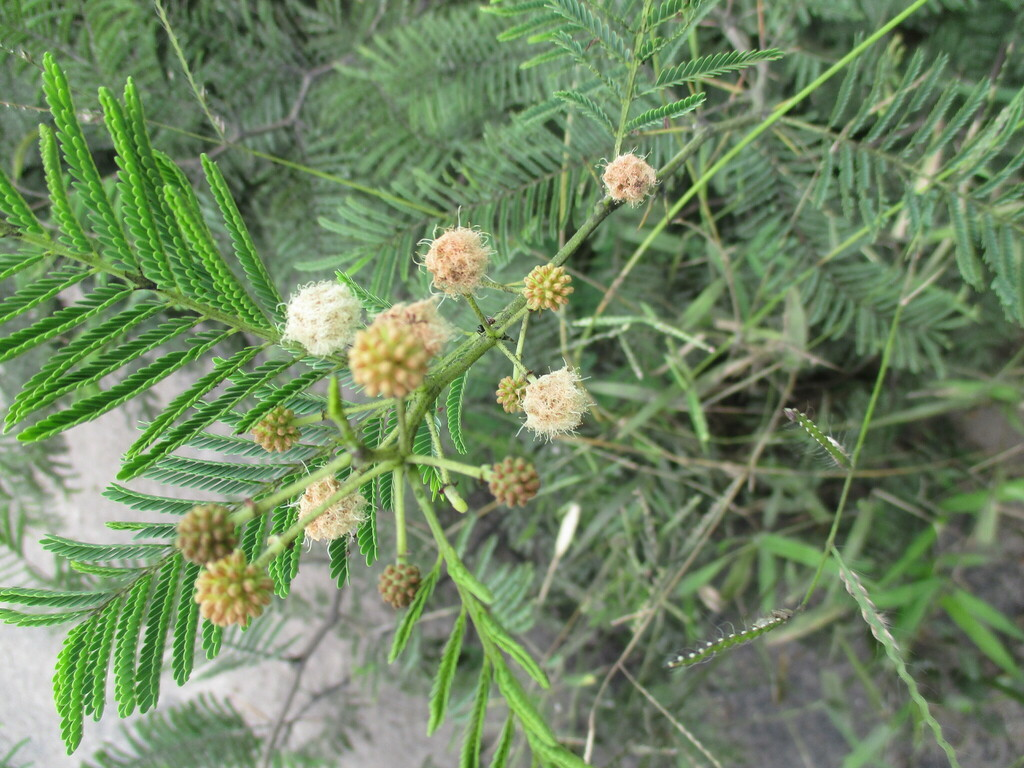

Scientific classification
- Kingdom: Plantae
- Clade: Embryophytes
- Clade: Tracheophytes
- Clade: Angiosperms
- Clade: Eudicots
- Clade: Rosids
- Order: Fabales
- Family: Fabaceae
- Subfamily: Caesalpinioideae
- Clade: Mimosoid clade
- Genus: Vachellia
- Species: V. arenaria

Binomial name
- Vachellia arenaria (Schinz) Kyal. & Boatwr.

Synonyms
- Acacia arenaria Schinz; Acacia hermannii Baker f.; Acacia rufobrunnea N.E.Br.

= Vachellia arenaria =

Species of flowering plant

Vachellia arenaria is a species of flowering plant in the family Fabaceae. It is a shrub or tree with white or pink flowers. The species is native to southern Africa, and was described in 1900.

== Taxonomy ==
The species was described by Hans Schinz in 1900, and placed in the genus Acacia. In 2013, Bruce Kyalangalilwa and James S. Boatwright moved it to the genus Vachellia, as part of a larger taxonomic revision of Acacia.

== Distribution ==
Vachellia arenaria is native to the seasonally dry tropical biome of Angola, Botswana, Namibia (including the Caprivi Strip), Tanzania, and Zimbabwe.

The species grows in dry woodland, grassland, and shrubland. It is sometimes found growing near Mopane.

== Description ==
Vachellia arenaria is a shrub that grows to around 2 metres (6.6 ft) high, or a tree that grows to around 9 metres (30 ft) high. The trunk branches near the base. The bark is dark, and sometimes peels off to reveal green underbark. The flowers are white or pink. The fruit is a red-brown pod.

The species superficially resembles Vachellia davyi.

== Nomenclature ==
In English, Vachellia arenaria is commonly known as "Sand acacia" or "Sand thorn". In Afrikaans, it is known as sanddoring. In Mbukushu, it is known as muparapara.
