= Vachellia barahonensis =

Scientific classification
- Kingdom: Plantae
- Clade: Tracheophytes
- Clade: Angiosperms
- Clade: Eudicots
- Clade: Rosids
- Order: Fabales
- Family: Fabaceae
- Subfamily: Caesalpinioideae
- Clade: Mimosoid clade
- Genus: Vachellia
- Species: V. barahonensis

Binomial name
- Vachellia barahonensis (Urb. & Ekman) Seigler & Ebinger

Synonyms
- Acacia barahonensis Urb. & Ekman

Species of flowering plant

Vachellia barahonensis is a species of flowering plant in the family Fabaceae. It is a shrub or tree native to Hispaniola, and was described in 1929.

== Taxonomy ==
The species was described by Ignatz Urban and Erik Leonard Ekman in 1929, and placed in the genus Acacia. In 2006, David Stanley Seigler and John Edwin Ebinger moved it to the genus Vachellia.

== Distribution ==
Vachellia barahonensis is native to the seasonally dry tropical biome of the Dominican Republic and Haiti.

== Description ==
Vachellia barahonensis is a shrub or tree.
