= Ascalenia =

Scientific classification
- Kingdom: Animalia
- Phylum: Arthropoda
- Clade: Pancrustacea
- Class: Insecta
- Order: Lepidoptera
- Family: Cosmopterigidae
- Subfamily: Chrysopeleiinae
- Genus: Ascalenia; Wocke, 1877

Synonyms
- Cholotis Meyrick, 1911

Genus of moths

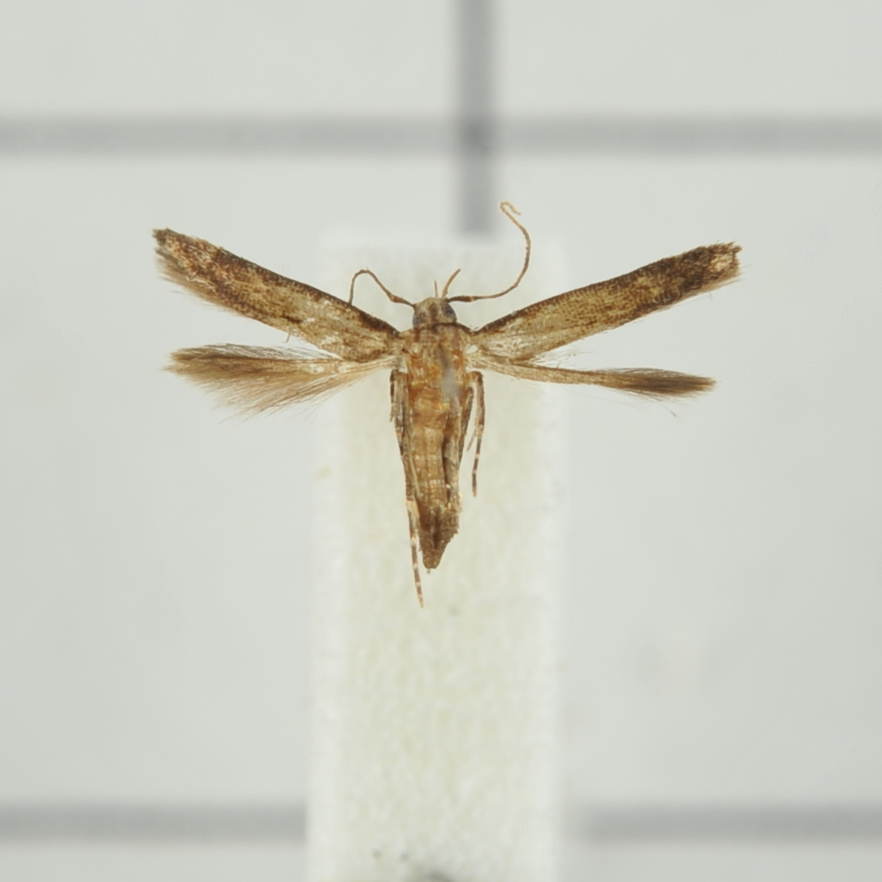
A pinned specimen of an Ascalenia moth species.

Ascalenia is a genus of moths in the family Cosmopterigidae.

== Species ==
- Ascalenia acaciella Chretien, 1915
- Ascalenia albitergis Meyrick, 1926
- Ascalenia antiqua Meyrick, 1925
- Ascalenia archaica Meyrick, 1917
- Ascalenia beieri Kasy, 1968
- Ascalenia bialbipunctella Legrand, 1965
- Ascalenia bifasciella Chrétien, 1915
- Ascalenia callynella Kasy, 1968
- Ascalenia centropselia Meyrick, 1931
- Ascalenia crypsiloga Meyrick, 1915
- Ascalenia decolorella Sinev, 1984
- Ascalenia echidnias (Meyrick, 1891)
- Ascalenia epicrypta Meyrick, 1915
- Ascalenia exodroma (Meyrick, 1897)
- Ascalenia gastrocosma Meyrick, 1931
- Ascalenia grisella Kusnetzov, 1957
- Ascalenia icriota Meyrick, 1915
- Ascalenia imbella Kasy, 1975
- Ascalenia isotacta Meyrick, 1911
- Ascalenia jerichoella Amsel, 1935
- Ascalenia kabulella Kasy, 1969
- Ascalenia kairaella Kasy, 1969
- Ascalenia liparophanes Meyrick, 1932
- Ascalenia melanogastra (Meyrick, 1918)
- Ascalenia molifera Meyrick, 1915
- Ascalenia nudicornis (Meyrick, 1913)
- Ascalenia pachnodes Meyrick, 1917
- Ascalenia pancrypta (Meyrick, 1915)
- Ascalenia phaneracma Meyrick, 1921
- Ascalenia plumbata (Meyrick, 1915)
- Ascalenia praediata Meyrick, 1922
- Ascalenia pseudofusella Legrand, 1965
- Ascalenia pulverata (Meyrick, 1913)
- Ascalenia revelata Meyrick, 1922
- Ascalenia scotochalca Meyrick, 1934
- Ascalenia secretifera Meyrick, 1932
- Ascalenia semnostola (Meyrick, 1897)
- Ascalenia sirjanella Kasy, 1975
- Ascalenia spermatica Meyrick, 1915
- Ascalenia staurocentra (Meyrick, 1915)
- Ascalenia subusta Meyrick, 1921
- Ascalenia synclina Meyrick, 1908
- Ascalenia thoracista Meyrick, 1915
- Ascalenia unifasciella Kasy, 1969
- Ascalenia vadata Meyrick, 1922
- Ascalenia vanella (Frey, 1860)
- Ascalenia vanelloides Gerasimov, 1930
- Ascalenia viviparella Kasy, 1969

== Former species ==
- Ascalenia antidesma
- Ascalenia ceanothiella Meyrick, 1915
- Ascalenia cardinata
- Ascalenia conformata
- Ascalenia eremella
- Ascalenia heterosticta Meyrick, 1917
- Ascalenia leucomelanella
- Ascalenia maculatella
- Ascalenia noviciata
- Ascalenia oranella
- Ascalenia phalacra Meyrick, 1909
- Ascalenia satellita
- Ascalenia seeboldiella
- Ascalenia signatella
- Ascalenia stagnans
- Ascalenia tergipunctella
