= Ascalenia acaciella =

Scientific classification
- Domain: Eukaryota
- Kingdom: Animalia
- Phylum: Arthropoda
- Class: Insecta
- Order: Lepidoptera
- Family: Cosmopterigidae
- Genus: Ascalenia
- Species: A. acaciella

Binomial name
- Ascalenia acaciella Chretien, 1915

Synonyms
- Scythris maculatella D. Lucas, 1937; Ascalenia maculatella; Tischeria noviciata Gozmany, 1960; Ascalenia noviciata; Scythris tergipunctella Turati, 1924; Ascalenia tergipunctella

Species of moth

Ascalenia acaciella is a moth in the family Cosmopterigidae. It is found on the Canary Islands and Malta, North Africa, the Near and Middle East and east to Afghanistan and Pakistan. The habitat consists of dry or desert-like areas.

The wingspan is 6–7 mm (0.24–0.28 in).

The larvae feed on the flower heads of Acacia species, including Acacia farnesiana, Acacia karroo and Acacia tortilis. Adults fly almost year-round, probably in several generations.
