= Gisilia stereodoxa =

Scientific classification
- Kingdom: Animalia
- Phylum: Arthropoda
- Class: Insecta
- Order: Lepidoptera
- Family: Cosmopterigidae
- Genus: Gisilia
- Species: G. stereodoxa

Binomial name
- Gisilia stereodoxa (Meyrick, 1925)

Synonyms
- Ascalenia stereodoxa Meyrick, 1925; Ascalenia evitans Meyrick, 1925; Stagmatophora alfieriella Rebel, 1926

Species of moth

Gisilia stereodoxa is a moth in the family Cosmopterigidae. It is found along the coast of the Mediterranean area (also on Sardinia and Malta) and Egypt to Iran and India. It has recently been recorded from Kenya and Namibia.

The wingspan is 7–9 mm. Adults have been recorded from January to February, April to May and from July to October.

The larvae feed on the inflorescences of Acacia nilotica, Acacia tortilis and probably other Acacia species.
