= Ascalenia pachnodes =

Scientific classification
- Kingdom: Animalia
- Phylum: Arthropoda
- Class: Insecta
- Order: Lepidoptera
- Family: Cosmopterigidae
- Genus: Ascalenia
- Species: A. pachnodes

Binomial name
- Ascalenia pachnodes (Meyrick, 1917)

Synonyms
- Cholotis pachnodes Meyrick, 1917

Species of moth

Ascalenia pachnodes is a moth in the family Cosmopterigidae. It has been recorded from Nubia and India (Bengal).

The wingspan is 6–9.2 mm.

The larvae feed on the twigs of Tamarix species, including Tamarix gallica, Tamarix indica and Tamarix dioica.
