= Ascalenia secretifera =

Scientific classification
- Kingdom: Animalia
- Phylum: Arthropoda
- Class: Insecta
- Order: Lepidoptera
- Family: Cosmopterigidae
- Genus: Ascalenia
- Species: A. secretifera

Binomial name
- Ascalenia secretifera Meyrick, 1932

Species of moth

Ascalenia secretifera is a moth in the family Cosmopterigidae. It is found in Ethiopia.
