= Ascalenia unifasciella =

Scientific classification
- Domain: Eukaryota
- Kingdom: Animalia
- Phylum: Arthropoda
- Class: Insecta
- Order: Lepidoptera
- Family: Cosmopterigidae
- Genus: Ascalenia
- Species: A. unifasciella

Binomial name
- Ascalenia unifasciella Kasy, 1969

Synonyms
- Batrachedra unifasciella

Species of moth

Ascalenia unifasciella is a moth in the family Cosmopterigidae. It is found in Afghanistan.

The wingspan is 6–7.2 mm.
