= Gisilia subcrocea =

Scientific classification
- Kingdom: Animalia
- Phylum: Arthropoda
- Class: Insecta
- Order: Lepidoptera
- Family: Cosmopterigidae
- Genus: Gisilia
- Species: G. subcrocea

Binomial name
- Gisilia subcrocea (Meyrick, 1923)

Synonyms
- Ascalenia subcrocea Meyrick, 1923

Species of moth

Gisilia subcrocea is a moth in the family Cosmopterigidae. It was described by Edward Meyrick in 1923. It is found in Egypt.
