= Ascalenia synclina =

Scientific classification
- Kingdom: Animalia
- Phylum: Arthropoda
- Class: Insecta
- Order: Lepidoptera
- Family: Cosmopterigidae
- Genus: Ascalenia
- Species: A. synclina

Binomial name
- Ascalenia synclina Meyrick, 1908

Species of moth

Ascalenia synclina is a moth in the family Cosmopterigidae. It was described by Edward Meyrick in 1908. It is found in India and on Java in Indonesia.
