= Ascalenia sirjanella =

Scientific classification
- Domain: Eukaryota
- Kingdom: Animalia
- Phylum: Arthropoda
- Class: Insecta
- Order: Lepidoptera
- Family: Cosmopterigidae
- Genus: Ascalenia
- Species: A. sirjanella

Binomial name
- Ascalenia sirjanella Kasy, 1975

Species of moth

Ascalenia sirjanella is a moth in the family Cosmopterigidae. It was described by Kasy in 1975. It is found in Iran.
