= Ascalenia decolorella =

Scientific classification
- Kingdom: Animalia
- Phylum: Arthropoda
- Clade: Pancrustacea
- Class: Insecta
- Order: Lepidoptera
- Family: Cosmopterigidae
- Genus: Ascalenia
- Species: A. decolorella

Binomial name
- Ascalenia decolorella Sinev, 1984

Species of moth

Ascalenia decolorella is a moth in the family Cosmopterigidae. It is found in southern Russia.
