= Stagmatophora chopardella =

Scientific classification
- Kingdom: Animalia
- Phylum: Arthropoda
- Class: Insecta
- Order: Lepidoptera
- Family: Cosmopterigidae
- Genus: Stagmatophora
- Species: S. chopardella

Binomial name
- Stagmatophora chopardella Viette, 1954

Species of moth

Stagmatophora chopardella is a moth in the family Cosmopterigidae. It is found in Madagascar.
