= Ascalenia melanogastra =

Scientific classification
- Kingdom: Animalia
- Phylum: Arthropoda
- Class: Insecta
- Order: Lepidoptera
- Family: Cosmopterigidae
- Genus: Ascalenia
- Species: A. melanogastra

Binomial name
- Ascalenia melanogastra (Meyrick, 1918)

Synonyms
- Cholotis melanogastra Meyrick, 1918

Species of moth

Ascalenia melanogastra is a moth in the family Cosmopterigidae. It is found in South Africa.
