= Ascalenia isotacta =

Scientific classification
- Kingdom: Animalia
- Phylum: Arthropoda
- Class: Insecta
- Order: Lepidoptera
- Family: Cosmopterigidae
- Genus: Ascalenia
- Species: A. isotacta

Binomial name
- Ascalenia isotacta (Meyrick, 1911)

Synonyms
- Cholotis isotacta Meyrick, 1911

Species of moth

Ascalenia isotacta is a moth in the family Cosmopterigidae. It was described by Edward Meyrick in 1911. It is found on the Seychelles.
