= Ascalenia kairaella =

Scientific classification
- Domain: Eukaryota
- Kingdom: Animalia
- Phylum: Arthropoda
- Class: Insecta
- Order: Lepidoptera
- Family: Cosmopterigidae
- Genus: Ascalenia
- Species: A. kairaella

Binomial name
- Ascalenia kairaella Kasy, 1969

Species of moth

Ascalenia kairaella is a moth in the family Cosmopterigidae. It is found in the United Arab Emirates, Iran and India.

The wingspan is 5.5–8 mm.
