= Ascalenia gastrocosma =

Scientific classification
- Kingdom: Animalia
- Phylum: Arthropoda
- Class: Insecta
- Order: Lepidoptera
- Family: Cosmopterigidae
- Genus: Ascalenia
- Species: A. gastrocosma

Binomial name
- Ascalenia gastrocosma Meyrick, 1931

Species of moth

Ascalenia gastrocosma is a moth in the family Cosmopterigidae. It was described by Edward Meyrick in 1931. It is found in Bihar, India.

The wingspan is 6.1–6.6 mm (0.24–0.26 in). Adults have been recorded on wing in May, June and September.

The larvae feed on the leaves of Acacia catechu. They spin the leaves together.
