= Stagmatophora luciliella =

Scientific classification
- Kingdom: Animalia
- Phylum: Arthropoda
- Clade: Pancrustacea
- Class: Insecta
- Order: Lepidoptera
- Family: Cosmopterigidae
- Genus: Stagmatophora
- Species: S. luciliella

Binomial name
- Stagmatophora luciliella (Zeller, 1877)

Synonyms
- Elachista luciliella Zeller, 1877

Species of moth

Stagmatophora luciliella is a moth in the family Cosmopterigidae. It is found in Colombia.
