= Ascalenia nudicornis =

Scientific classification
- Kingdom: Animalia
- Phylum: Arthropoda
- Class: Insecta
- Order: Lepidoptera
- Family: Cosmopterigidae
- Genus: Ascalenia
- Species: A. nudicornis

Binomial name
- Ascalenia nudicornis (Meyrick, 1913)

Synonyms
- Cholotis nudicornis Meyrick, 1913

Species of moth

Ascalenia nudicornis is a moth in the family Cosmopterigidae. It is found in South Africa.

The larvae possibly feed on Tamarix species.
