= Ascalenia kabulella =

Scientific classification
- Domain: Eukaryota
- Kingdom: Animalia
- Phylum: Arthropoda
- Class: Insecta
- Order: Lepidoptera
- Family: Cosmopterigidae
- Genus: Ascalenia
- Species: A. kabulella

Binomial name
- Ascalenia kabulella Kasy, 1969

Synonyms
- Batrachedra kabulella

Species of moth

Ascalenia kabulella is a moth in the family Cosmopterigidae. It is found in Afghanistan.

The wingspan is 7.1-8.8 mm.
