= Ascalenia revelata =

Scientific classification
- Kingdom: Animalia
- Phylum: Arthropoda
- Class: Insecta
- Order: Lepidoptera
- Family: Cosmopterigidae
- Genus: Ascalenia
- Species: A. revelata

Binomial name
- Ascalenia revelata Meyrick, 1922

Species of moth

Ascalenia revelata is a moth in the family Cosmopterigidae. It was described by Edward Meyrick in 1922. It is found in Brazil (from Para).
