= Ascalenia vanella =

Scientific classification
- Kingdom: Animalia
- Phylum: Arthropoda
- Class: Insecta
- Order: Lepidoptera
- Family: Cosmopterigidae
- Genus: Ascalenia
- Species: A. vanella

Binomial name
- Ascalenia vanella (Frey, 1860)

Synonyms
- Laverna vanella Frey, 1860; Laverna seeboldiella Ragonot, 1882; Ascalenia seeboldiella

Species of moth

Ascalenia vanella is a moth in the family Cosmopterigidae. It is found in Spain, France, Germany, Switzerland, Austria, Slovakia, Hungary, Greece, Crete, Italy, Sicily, Ukraine and southern Russia. It is also found on the Canary Islands and in Asia Minor.

The wingspan is 7–10.5 mm.

The larvae feed on the buds of Myricaria germanica and possibly Tamarix species.
