= Gisilia lerautella =

Scientific classification
- Kingdom: Animalia
- Phylum: Arthropoda
- Clade: Pancrustacea
- Class: Insecta
- Order: Lepidoptera
- Family: Cosmopterigidae
- Genus: Gisilia
- Species: G. lerautella

Binomial name
- Gisilia lerautella Gibeaux, 1986

Species of moth

Gisilia lerautella is a moth in the family Cosmopterigidae. It is found in France. It was described from the Fontainebleau forest, but is thought to be an introduced species.

The wingspan is 6–8 mm.

The biology of the species is unknown. Only seven individuals have been recorded. They were found from the end of April to the beginning of May on the stems of oak trees.
