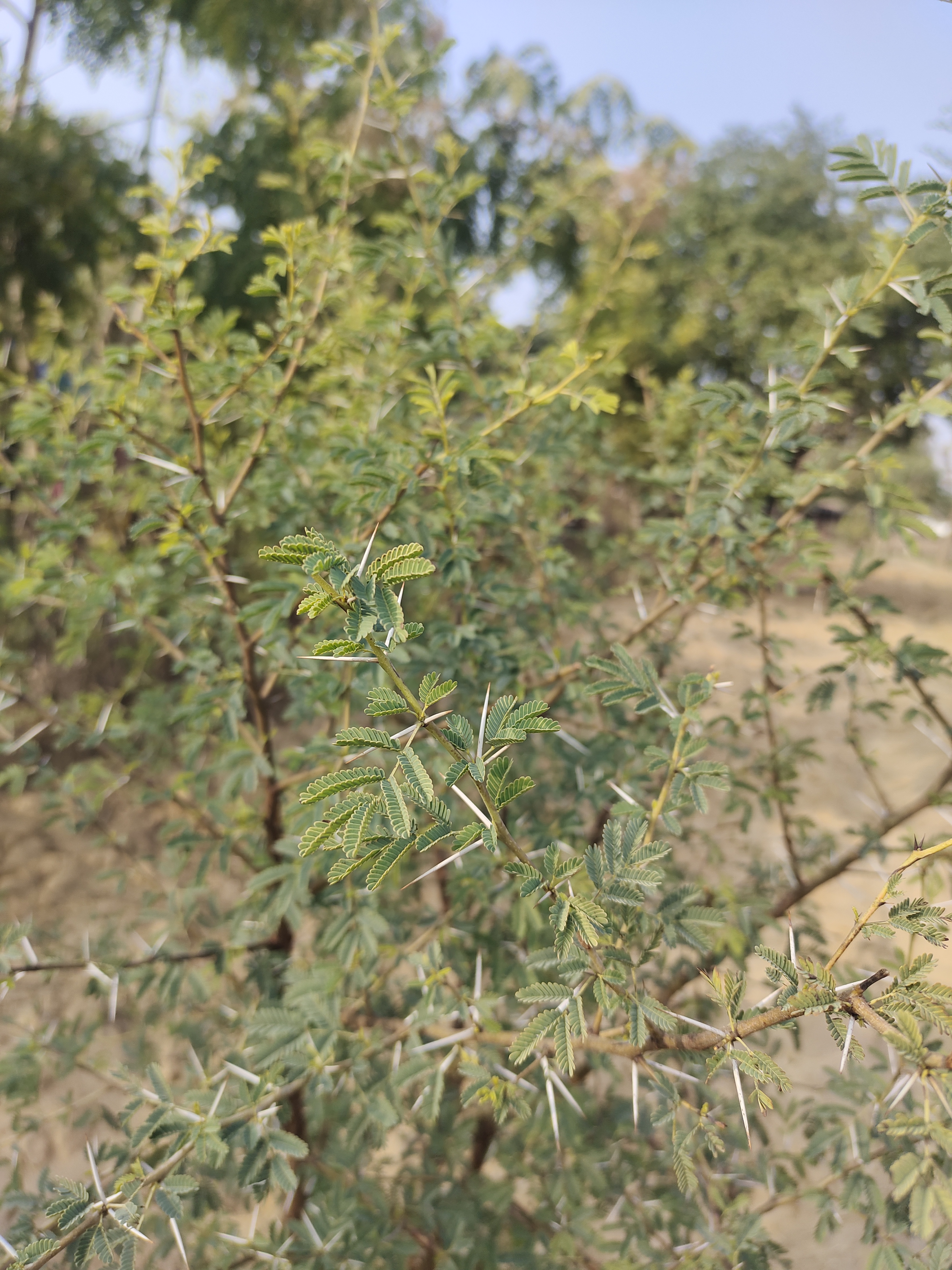
- Leaves and thorns

Scientific classification
- Kingdom: Plantae
- Clade: Tracheophytes
- Clade: Angiosperms
- Clade: Eudicots
- Clade: Rosids
- Order: Fabales
- Family: Fabaceae
- Subfamily: Caesalpinioideae
- Clade: Mimosoid clade
- Genus: Vachellia
- Species: V. nilotica

Binomial name
- Vachellia nilotica (L.) P.J.H.Hurter & Mabb.

Subspecies
- Vachellia nilotica subsp. adstringens (Schumach. & Thonn.) Kyal. & Boatwr.; Vachellia nilotica subsp. cupressiformis (J.L.Stewart) Ali & Faruqi; Vachellia nilotica subsp. hemispherica Ali & Faruqi; Vachellia nilotica subsp. indica (Benth.) Kyal. & Boatwr.; Vachellia nilotica subsp. kraussiana (Benth.) Kyal. & Boatwr.; Vachellia nilotica subsp. leiocarpa (Brenan) Kyal. & Boatwr.; Vachellia nilotica subsp. nilotica; Vachellia nilotica subsp. subalata (Vatke) Kyal. & Boatwr.; Vachellia nilotica subsp. tomentosa (Benth.) Kyal. & Boatwr.
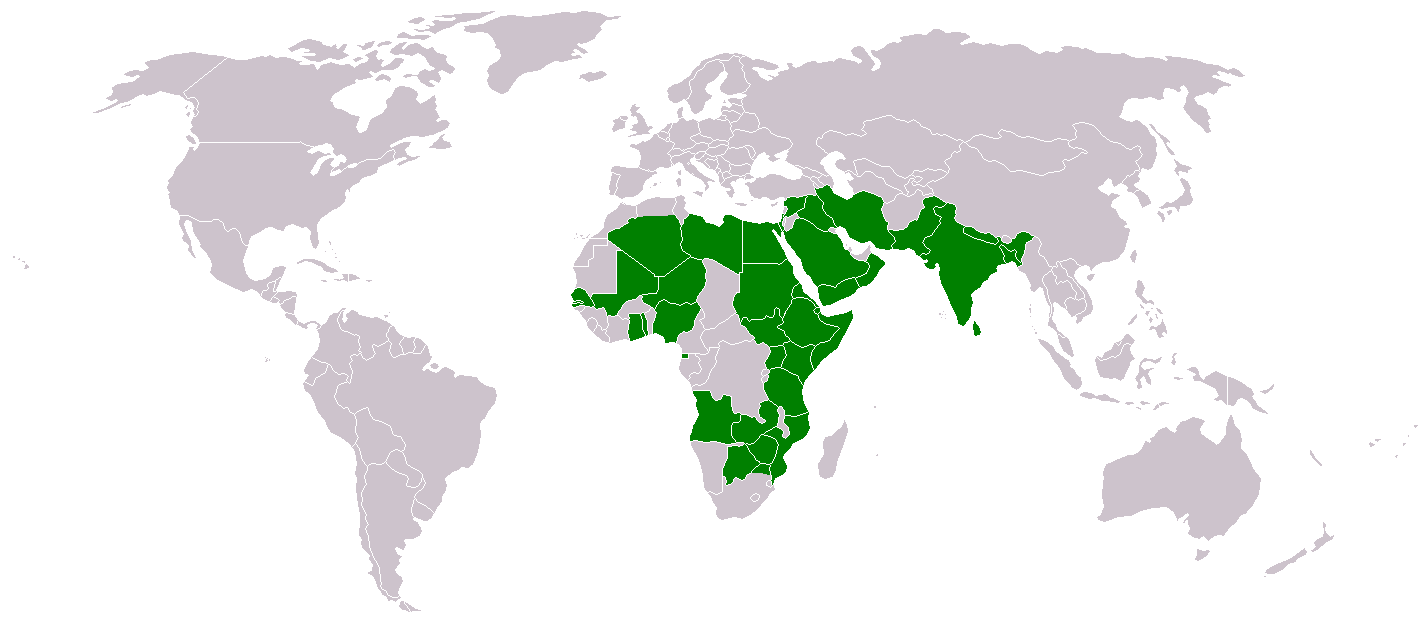
- Range of Vachellia nilotica

Synonyms
- Acacia arabica (Lam.) Willd.; Acacia nilotica (L.) Willd. ex Delile; Acacia scorpioides (L.) W.Wight; Mimosa arabica Lam.; Mimosa nilotica L.; Mimosa scorpioides L.

= Vachellia nilotica =

Species of flowering plant in the bean family

Vachellia nilotica, more commonly known as Acacia nilotica, and by the vernacular names of gum arabic tree, babul, thorn mimosa, Egyptian acacia or thorny acacia, is a flowering tree in the family Fabaceae. It is native to Africa, the Middle East and the Indian subcontinent.

== Taxonomy ==
This species of tree is the type species of the Linnaean genus Acacia, which derives its name from Greek ἀκακία, akakía, the name given by early Greek botanist-physician Pedanius Dioscorides (c. AD 40–90) to this tree as a medicinal, in his book Materia Medica. The genus Acacia was long known not to be taxonomically monophyletic, and despite being the type species of that genus, A. nilotica has since been moved to the genus Vachellia, with the genus name Acacia being reserved for Australian species; the principle of priority, which would normally prevent such a taxonomic change, was waived with a majority vote by the International Botanical Congress in 2005. The renaming of the traditional Acacia to Vachellia remains controversial, especially in Africa, where V. nilotica is an iconic species and is widely referred to as "the acacia". For the new classification of this and other species historically classified under genus Acacia, see Acacia.

The genus name Acacia derives from ἀκακία, which may come from the ancient Greek word ἄκις, ákis, "thorn", for its characteristic thorns, or may have been borrowed from a pre-Greek language. The specific epithet nilotica was probably given by Linnaeus from the tree's originally known range along the Nile river. In Australia the tree is known as a prickly acacia, despite usurping Dioscorides' two millennia-old etymology, the Australian species classified as Acacia in Australia do not have thorns.

== Description ==
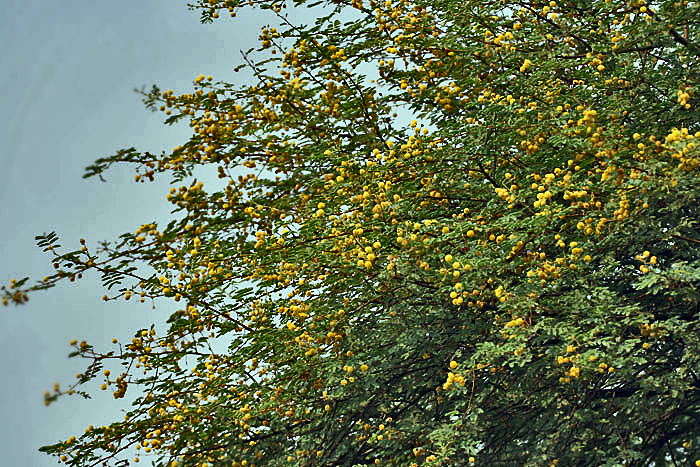
Spring blossoms in the North Indian state of Haryana, India

Acacia nilotica or Vachellia nilotica is a tree 5–20 m (16–66 ft) high with a dense spheric crown, stems and branches usually dark to black coloured, fissured bark, grey-pinkish slash, exuding a reddish low quality gum. The tree has thin, straight, light, grey spines in axillary pairs, usually in 3 to 12 pairs, 5 to 7.5 cm (3 in) long in young trees, mature trees commonly without thorns. The leaves are bipinnate, with 3–6 pairs of pinnulae and 10–30 pairs of leaflets each, tomentose, rachis with a gland at the bottom of the last pair of pinnulae. Flowers in globulous heads 1.2–1.5 cm in diameter of a bright golden-yellow color, set up either axillary or whorly on peduncles 2–3 cm long located at the end of the branches. Pods are strongly constricted, hairy, white-grey, thick and softly tomentose. Its seeds number approximately 8000/kg.

== Distribution ==
Acacia nilotica or Vachellia nilotica is native to Egypt, across the Maghreb and Sahel, south to Mozambique and KwaZulu-Natal, South Africa, and east through the Arabian Peninsula to the Indian subcontinent and Burma. It has become widely naturalised outside its native range including Zanzibar and Australia. It is spread by livestock.

== Uses ==
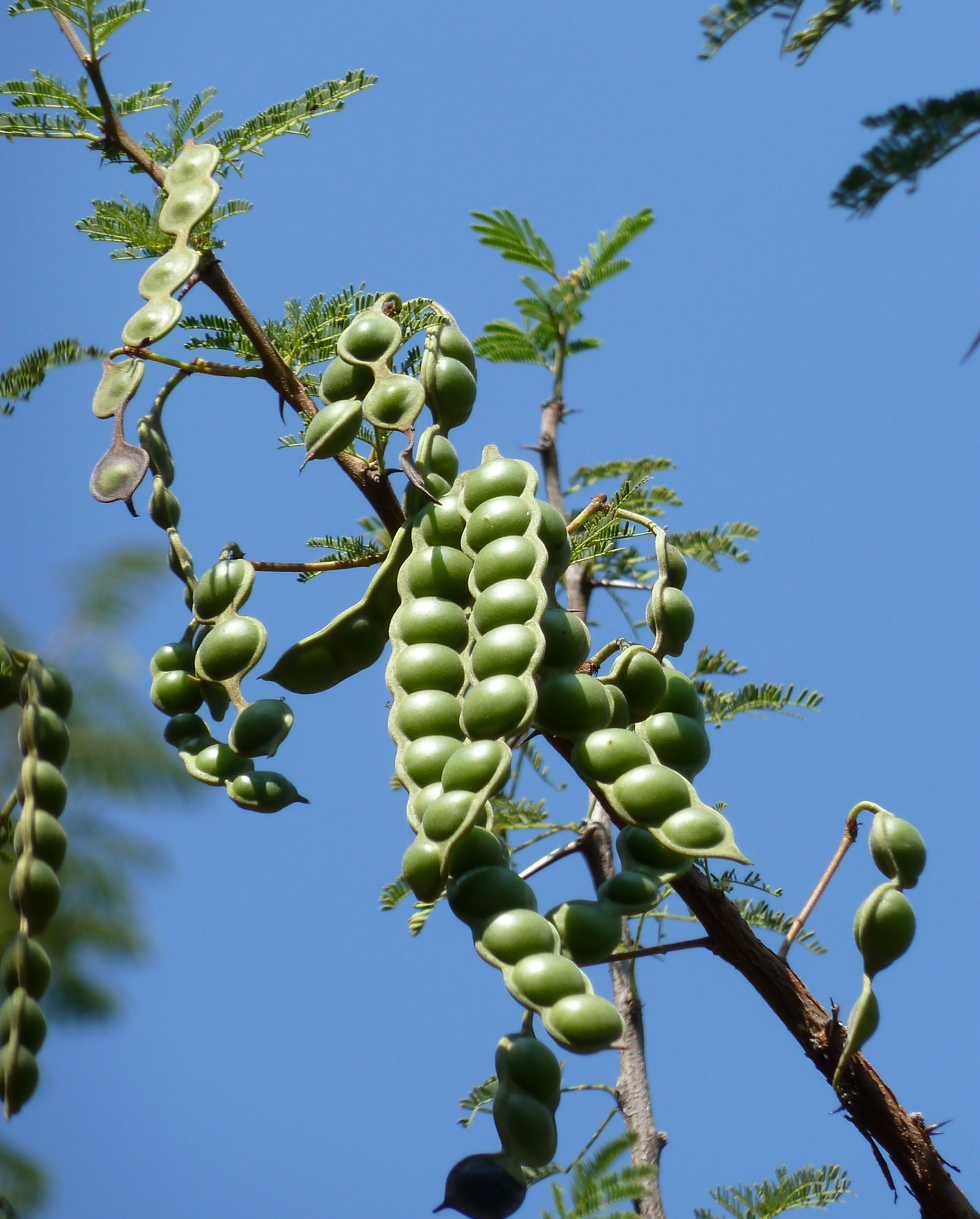
Seed pods

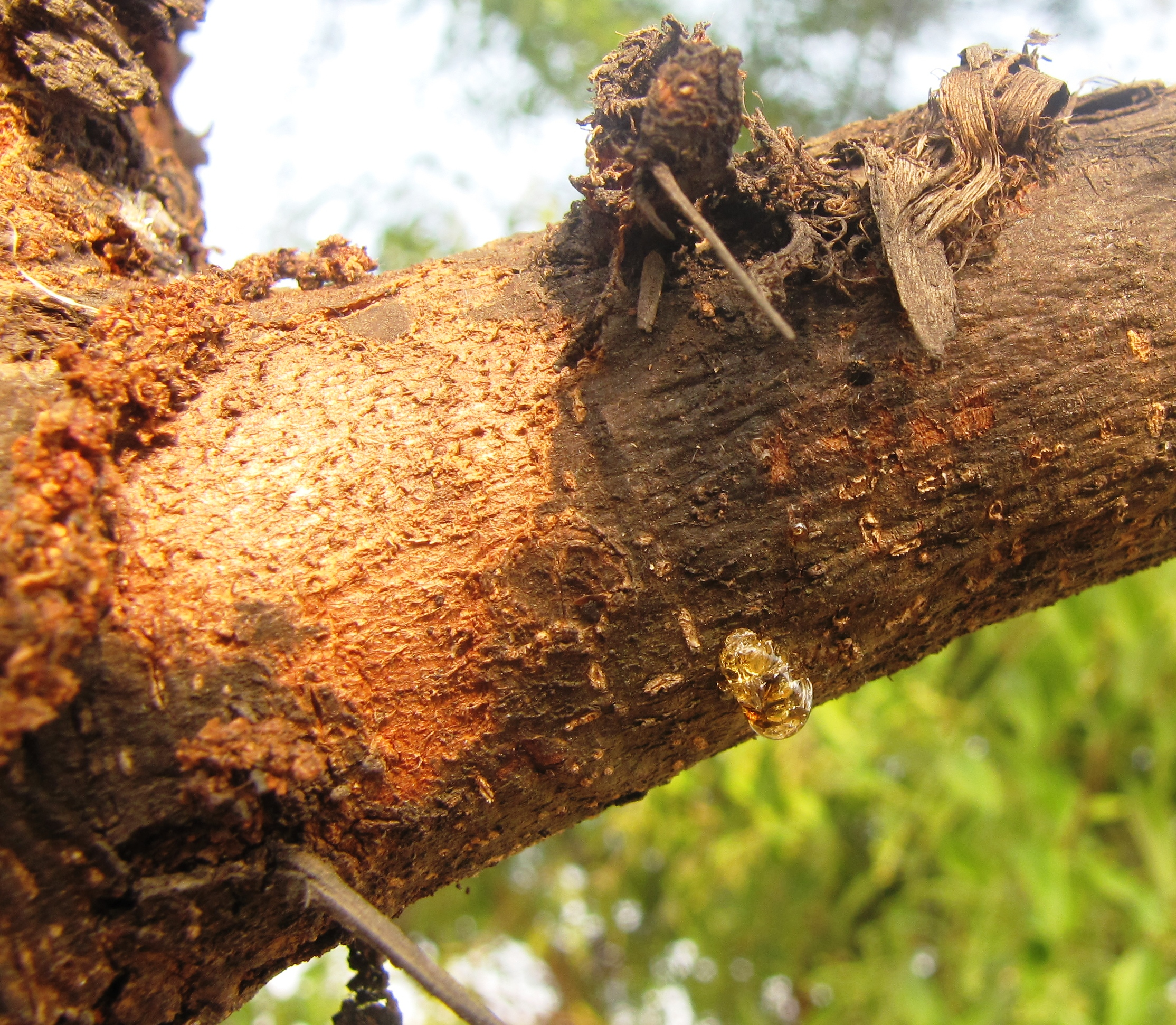
Gum arabic exuding

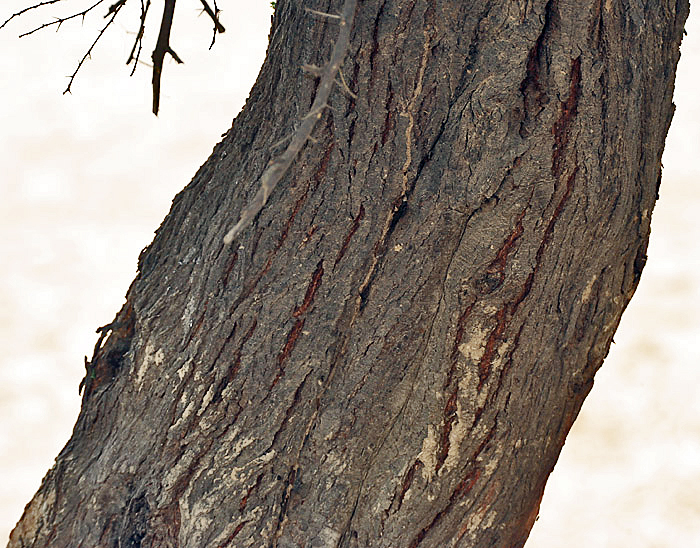
Trunk at Hodal in Faridabad District of Haryana, India

=== Forage and fodder ===
In part of its range, smallstock consume the pods and leaves, but elsewhere it is also very popular with cattle.

In South Africa, milling of twigs and branches is applied to produce animal fodder. The milling helps to reduce the dispersal of seeds through the animals, which otherwise would contribute to further woody plant encroachment in the region.

Pods are used as a supplement to poultry rations in India. Dried pods are particularly sought out by animals on rangelands. In India branches are commonly lopped for fodder.

In West Africa, the pods and leaves are considered to have anthelminthic properties on small ruminants and this has been confirmed by in vitro experiments on nematodes.

In Kano of Nigeria, acacia pods have traditionally been used to dye leather a reddish-tinge.

=== Tooth brushing ===
The tender twig of this plant is used as a toothbrush in south-east Africa and the Indian subcontinent.

=== Gum arabic ===
The exudate gum of this tree is known as gum arabic and has been collected from the pharaonic times for the manufacture of medicines, dyes and paints. In the present commercial market, gum arabic is defined as the dried exudate from the trunks and branches of Senegalia (Acacia) senegal or Vachellia (Acacia) seyal in the family Leguminosae (Fabaceae). The gum of A. nilotica is also referred to in India as Amaravati gum.

=== Lumber ===
The tree's wood is "very durable if water-seasoned" and its uses include tool handles and lumber for boats. The wood has a density of about 833 kg/m^{3}.

=== Food and medicine ===
In India it is used as an ingredient in various dishes.

The Maasai people eat both the inner bark (phloem) and the fruit pulp boiled in water. The East african tribes living on the savanna use this plant medicinally to treat sore throat, cough, chest pains etc.

In Northern Nigeria it is called bagaruwa in Hausa. Medicinal uses include soaking the tender bark in water to be taken against dysentery and pile. The fruits are ground together with the seeds and taken with honey as treatment against stomach ulcers.

== Phytochemistry ==
Two new antiprotozoal diterpenes have been isolated from the root bark of Acacia nilotica.

== Propagation ==
There are 5000–16,000 seeds/kg.

== Gallery ==
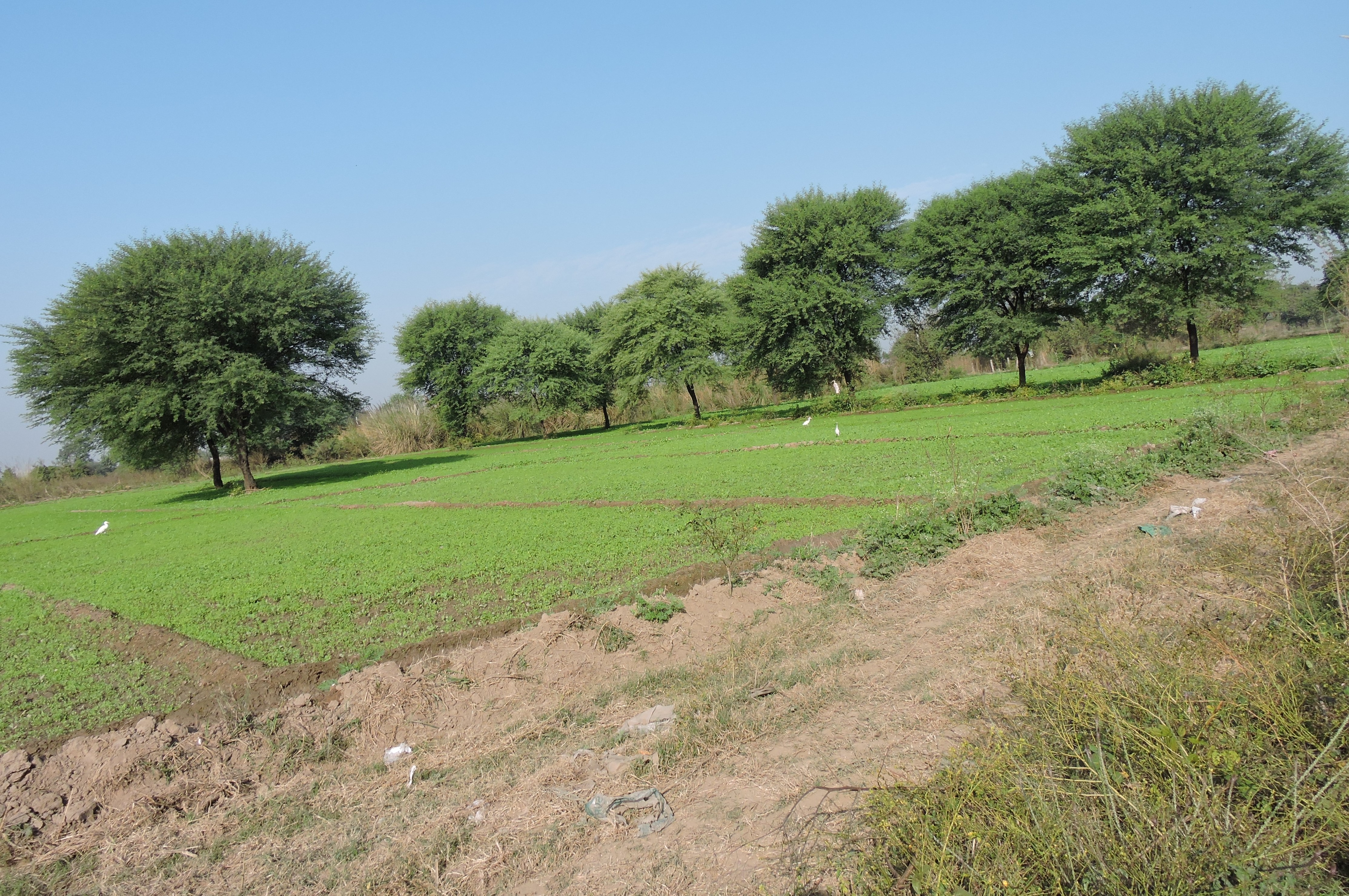
Vachellia nilotica, Village Behlolpur, Punjab, India

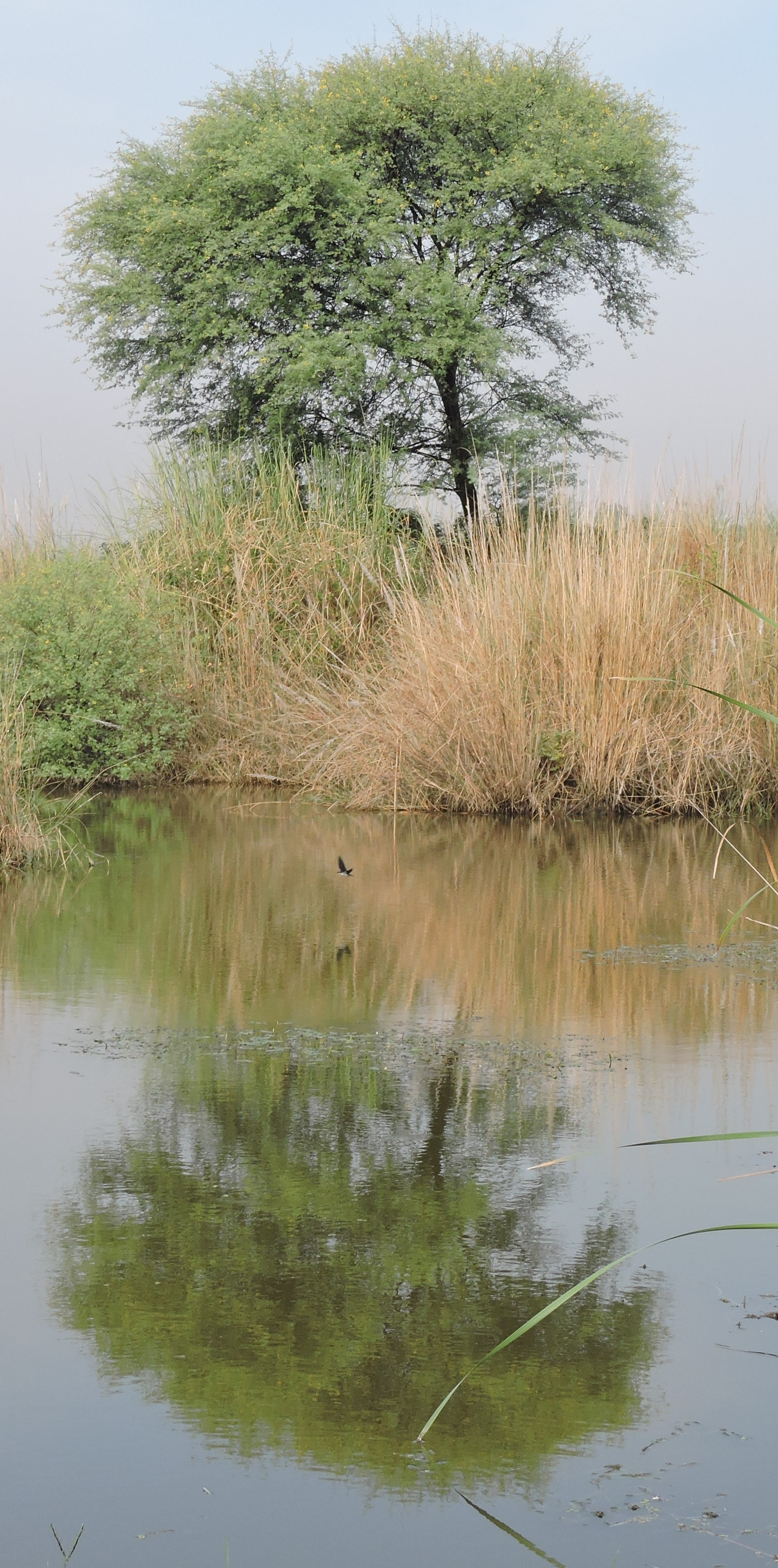
Village Chaparr Chirri, Mohali, Punjab, India

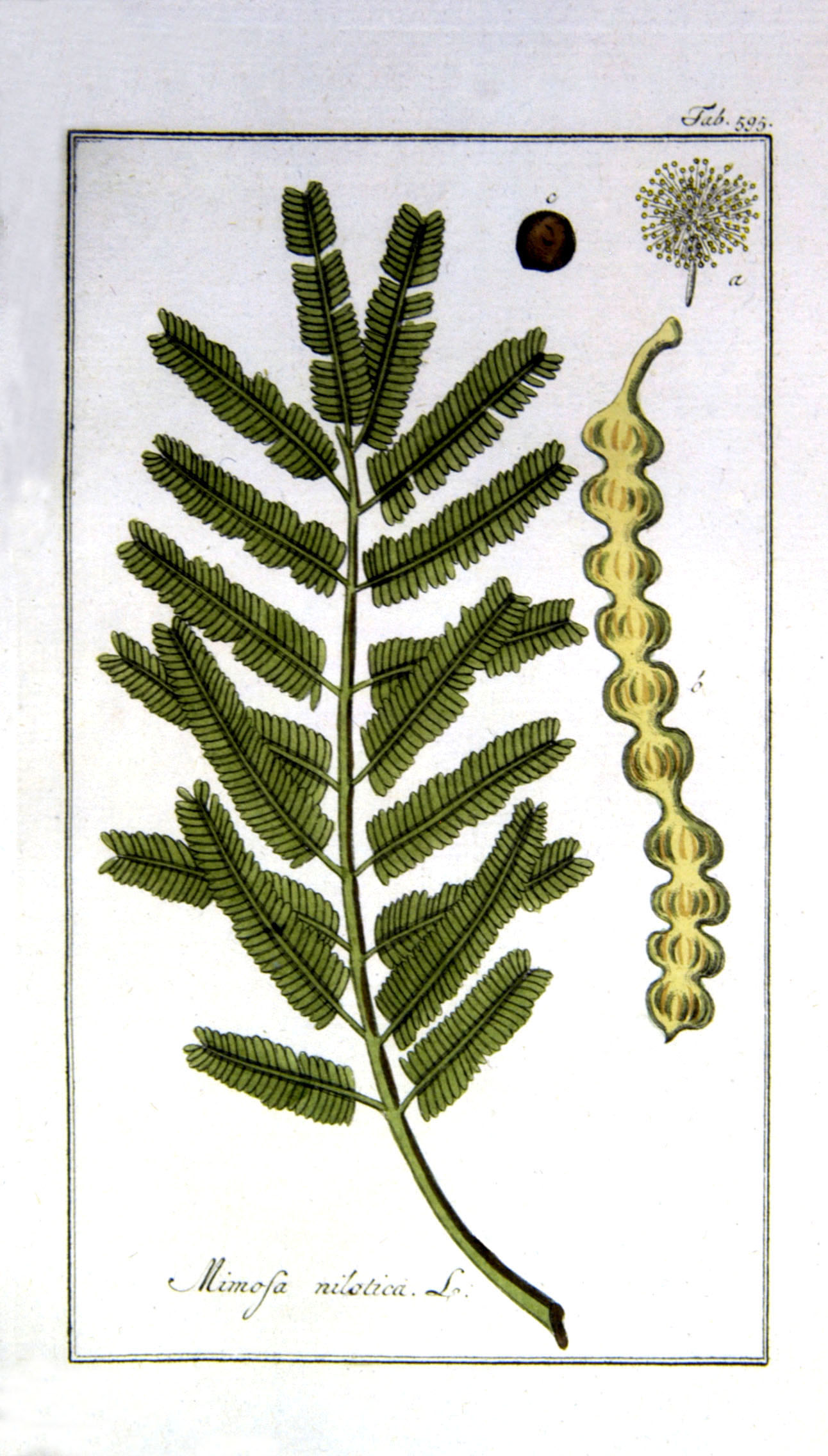
Compound leaf, seed, flower and seed pod

== See also ==
- List of Indian timber trees
- Arid Forest Research Institute (AFRI)
- Babool (brand) of toothpaste
- Teeth-cleaning twig (datun)
