= Ascalenia callynella =

Scientific classification
- Domain: Eukaryota
- Kingdom: Animalia
- Phylum: Arthropoda
- Class: Insecta
- Order: Lepidoptera
- Family: Cosmopterigidae
- Genus: Ascalenia
- Species: A. callynella

Binomial name
- Ascalenia callynella Kasy, 1968

Species of moth

Ascalenia callynella is a moth in the family Cosmopterigidae. It is found in Egypt, the United Arab Emirates, Iran and Israel.

The wingspan is 8–9.8 mm (0.31–0.39 in).

The larvae feed on Tamarix species.
