= Stagmatophora notoleuca =

Scientific classification
- Domain: Eukaryota
- Kingdom: Animalia
- Phylum: Arthropoda
- Class: Insecta
- Order: Lepidoptera
- Family: Cosmopterigidae
- Genus: Stagmatophora
- Species: S. notoleuca

Binomial name
- Stagmatophora notoleuca Turner, 1923

Species of moth

Stagmatophora notoleuca is a moth in the family Cosmopterigidae. It is found in Australia, where it has been recorded from Queensland.
