= Ascalenia bialbipunctella =

Scientific classification
- Domain: Eukaryota
- Kingdom: Animalia
- Phylum: Arthropoda
- Class: Insecta
- Order: Lepidoptera
- Family: Cosmopterigidae
- Genus: Ascalenia
- Species: A. bialbipunctella

Binomial name
- Ascalenia bialbipunctella Legrand, 1965

Species of moth

Ascalenia bialbipunctella is a moth in the family Cosmopterigidae. It was described by Henry Legrand in 1965. It is found on the Seychelles.
