= Ascalenia albitergis =

Scientific classification
- Kingdom: Animalia
- Phylum: Arthropoda
- Class: Insecta
- Order: Lepidoptera
- Family: Cosmopterigidae
- Genus: Ascalenia
- Species: A. albitergis

Binomial name
- Ascalenia albitergis Meyrick, 1926

Species of moth

Ascalenia albitergis is a moth in the family Cosmopterigidae. It is found in South Africa.
