= Stagmatophora diakonoffi =

Scientific classification
- Kingdom: Animalia
- Phylum: Arthropoda
- Class: Insecta
- Order: Lepidoptera
- Family: Cosmopterigidae
- Genus: Stagmatophora
- Species: S. diakonoffi

Binomial name
- Stagmatophora diakonoffi Viette, 1968

Species of moth

Stagmatophora diakonoffi is a moth in the family Cosmopterigidae. It is found in Madagascar.
