= Ascalenia phaneracma =

Scientific classification
- Kingdom: Animalia
- Phylum: Arthropoda
- Class: Insecta
- Order: Lepidoptera
- Family: Cosmopterigidae
- Genus: Ascalenia
- Species: A. phaneracma

Binomial name
- Ascalenia phaneracma Meyrick, 1921

Species of moth

Ascalenia phaneracma is a moth in the family Cosmopterigidae. First described by Edward Meyrick in 1921, it is found in Zimbabwe.
