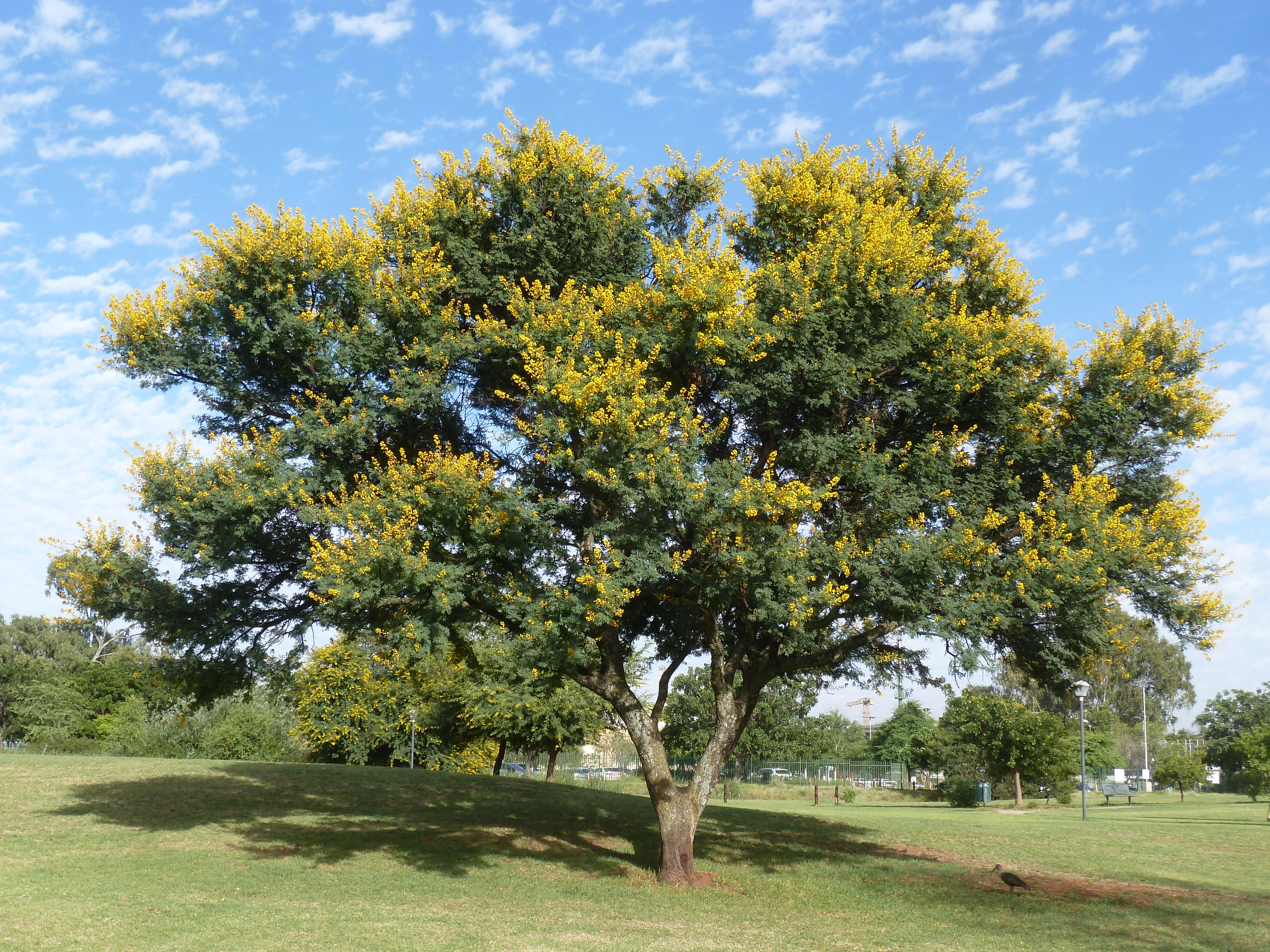

Scientific classification
- Kingdom: Plantae
- Clade: Embryophytes
- Clade: Tracheophytes
- Clade: Spermatophytes
- Clade: Angiosperms
- Clade: Eudicots
- Clade: Rosids
- Order: Fabales
- Family: Fabaceae
- Subfamily: Caesalpinioideae
- Clade: Mimosoid clade
- Genus: Vachellia
- Species: V. karroo

Binomial name
- Vachellia karroo (Hayne) Banfi & Galasso
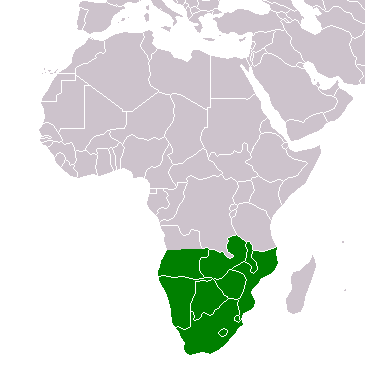
- Native range of V. karroo

Synonyms
- Acacia capensis (Burm.f.) Burch.; Acacia dekindtiana A.Chev.; Acacia hirtella E.Mey.; Acacia hirtella var. inermis Walp.; Acacia horrida var. transvaalensis Burtt Davy; Acacia inconflagrabilis Gerstner; Acacia karroo Hayne; Acacia karroo var. transvaalensis (Burtt Davy) Burtt Davy; Acacia reticulata (L.) Willd.; Mimosa capensis Burm.f.; Mimosa reticulata L.

= Vachellia karroo =

Sweet thorn

Species of legume

Vachellia karroo, (synonym Acacia karroo) commonly known as the sweet thorn, common acacia, Karoo thorn, Cape gum or cockspur thorn, is a species of Vachellia, in the Mimosa sub-family (Mimosoideae) of the Fabaceae or pea family, which is native to southern Africa from southern Angola east to Mozambique, and south to South Africa.

It is a shrub or small to medium-sized tree which grows to height of 12m. It is difficult to tell apart from Vachellia nilotica subsp. adstringens without examining the seed pods. The Botanical Society of South Africa has accepted a name change to Vachellia karroo.

Common names in various languages include doringboom, soetdoring, cassie, piquants blancs, cassie piquants blancs, deo-babool, doorn boom, kaludai, kikar, mormati, pahari kikar, umga and udai vel.

== Identification ==
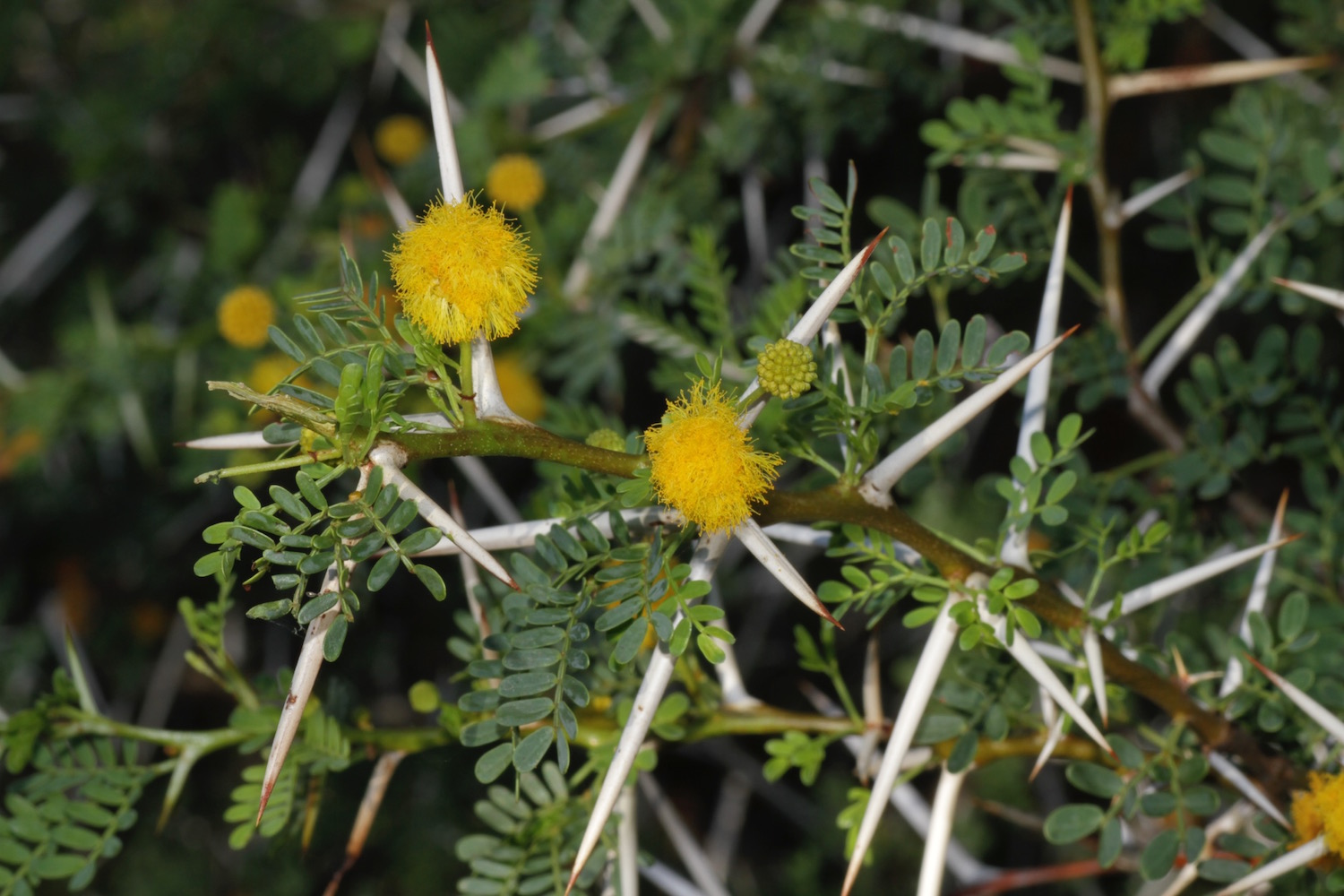
Close-up of flower heads, thorns and leaves

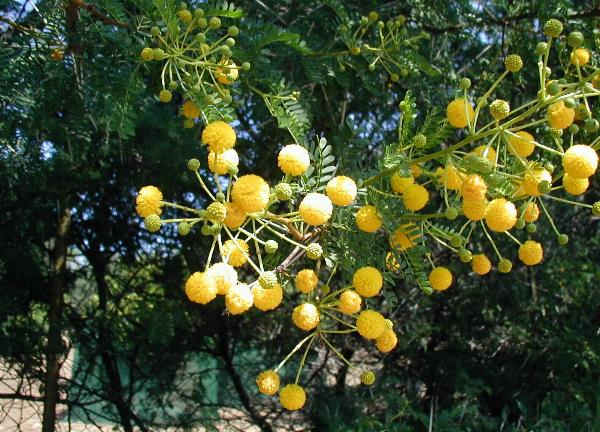
Golden-coloured flower heads

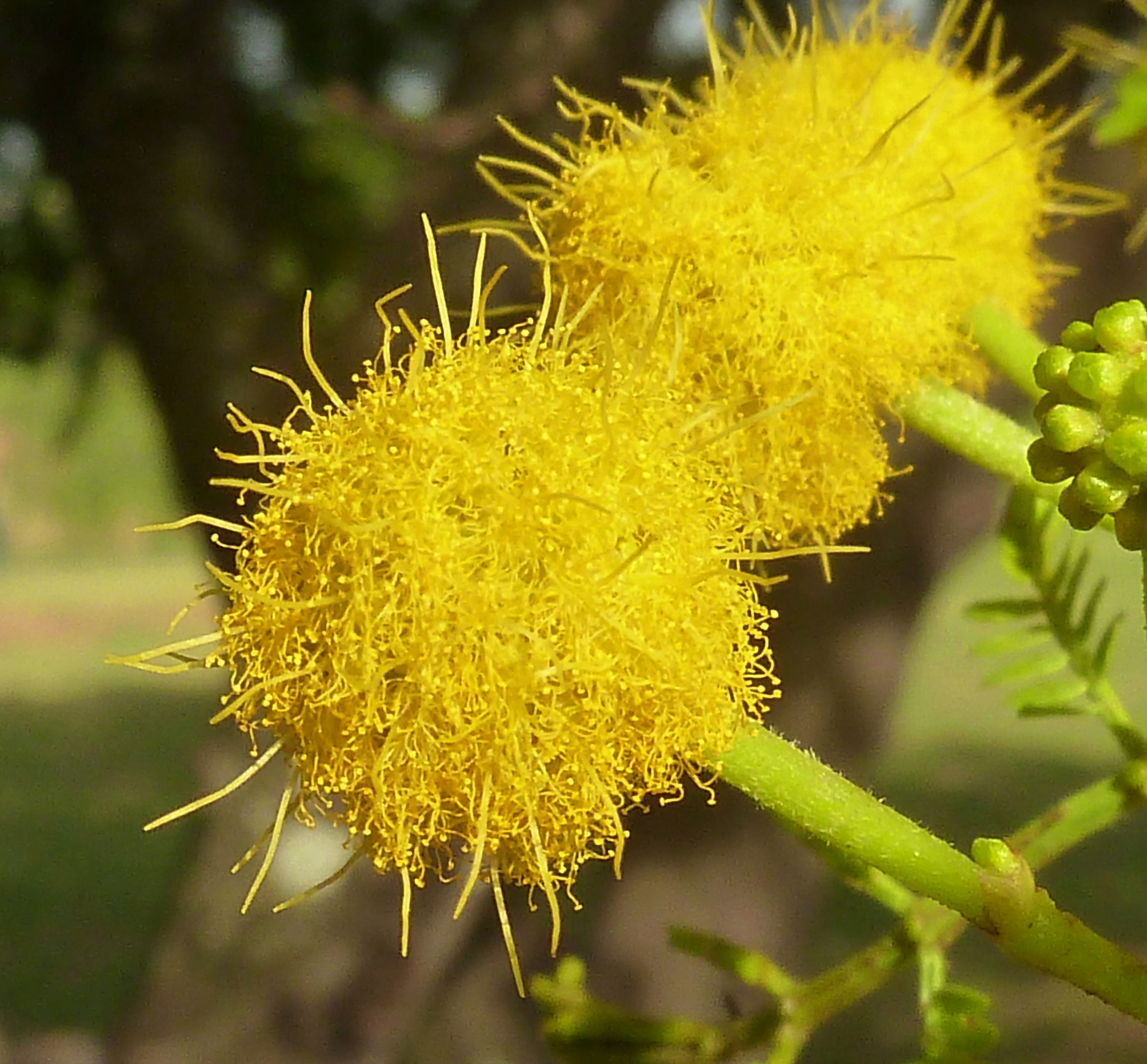
Close-up of flower heads

It is a shrub or small to medium-sized tree which grows to height of 12m. Vachellia karroo has a rounded crown, branching fairly low down on the trunk. It is variable in shape and size, reaching a maximum of about 12m where there is good water. The bark is red on young branches, darkening and becoming rough with age. Sometimes an attractive reddish colour can be seen in the deep bark fissures The leaves are finely textured and dark green. The abundant yellow flowers appear in early summer, or after good rains. The seed pods are narrow, flat and crescent shaped. They are green when young becoming brown and dry. The pods split open allowing the seeds to fall to the ground. The formidable thorns are paired, greyish to white and are long and straight; up to ten inches (250 mm) in length, the longest simple thorn of any Dicot.

== Distribution ==
It is a tree of open woodland and wooded grassland. It grows to its greatest size when rainfall of 800-900mm is received but can grow and even thrive in very dry conditions such as the Karoo region of western South Africa. The requirement here is for deep soils that allow its roots to spread. Everywhere in its range, however, the tree is easily recognised by its distinctive long white paired thorns and coffee coloured bark, both of which are very attractive. In the tropics it shows little variation but at the southern end of its range it becomes more variable in appearance.

== Adaptations ==
Vachellia karroo has a life span of 30–40 years and is an adaptable pioneer, able to establish itself without shade, shelter or protection from grass fires. Once over a year old, seedlings can resprout after fire. Several fungi are associated with this tree and the crown of mature trees may be parasitized by various mistletoes, leading to the tree's decline. This tree has a long taproot which enables it to use water and nutrients from deep underground, this and its ability to fix nitrogen, lead to grasses and other plants thriving in its shade.

The tree has been noted to occur in the Torre del Mar area, near Malaga, Spain. Here it grows freely as a large shrub on waste ground. It has been used as hedging to keep out goats from vegetable plots. It flowers during July.

== Uses ==
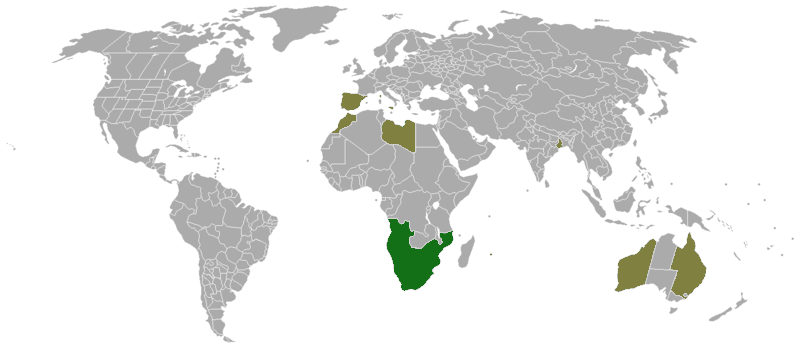
native range introduced to region

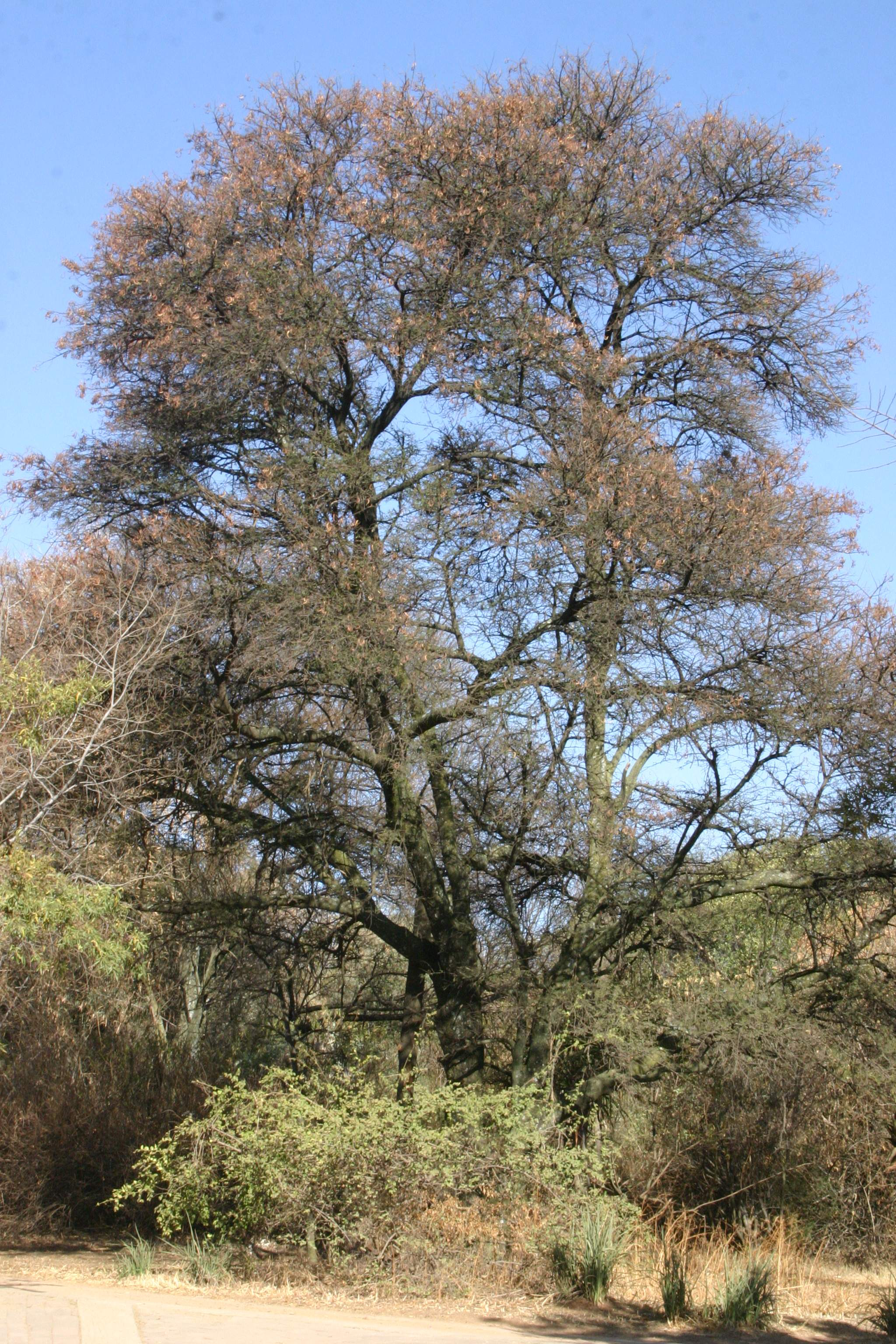
Winter habit of tree

V. karroo is used for chemical products, forage, domestic uses, environmental management, fibre, food, drink, and wood. The tough wood is white to slightly yellowish in colour, rarely producing dark brown heartwood. It is widely cultivated in Asia, Australia, the Mediterranean region, India and the Indian Ocean area. The large thorns mean that the tree must be approached, and the branches handled, carefully.

=== Food ===
As is common in acacias, edible gum seeps from cracks in the tree's bark, and is an important part of the bushbaby's winter diet. The gum can be used to manufacture sweets (see Gum arabic) and used to have economic importance as "Cape Gum". In dry areas, the tree's presence is a sign of water, both above and underground.

=== Forage and fodder ===
The tree is especially useful as forage and fodder for domestic and wild animals. Apparently, there is no risk of poisoning from it. Goats seem to like V. karroo better than cattle. The small pom-pom shaped yellow flowers are attractive in mid-summer. The flowers make it a very good source of forage for honey bees; honey from it has a pleasant taste.

=== Wood and bark ===
V. karroo is an excellent source of firewood and charcoal. The wood is also used for fencing posts for cattle byres or kraals. The heartwood has a density of about 800 kg/m^{3}. A tough rope can be made from the inside bark of the tree.

=== Traditional medicine ===
This species, especially the bark (which can be chewed safely), is also used to treat oral thrush and ulcers. The roots are also used medicinally. They may be chewed for use as an aphrodisiac or powdered and used for dizziness. The gum, bark and leaves have been used as a soothing agent and astringent for colds, conjunctivitis and hemorrhage in other regions of Southern Africa. The bark and leaves have also been used to treat convulsions and stomach problems (including nausea) and as a coagulant.

The thorns were used by early naturalists to pin the insects they collected. It is very widespread throughout southern Africa and there are different forms in some places, which can be confusing. Vachellia karroo may be found from the Western Cape through to Zambia and Angola. In tropical Africa it is replaced by Vachellia seyal. The name acacia is derived from Greek "akis" a point or barb. Karroo is one of the old spellings of karoo which cannot be corrected because of the laws governing botanical nomenclature (giving of names).

=== Ornament ===
Vachellia karroo was introduced to Australia in 1967 as an ornamental plant. It then spread invasively, prompting large-scale efforts to eradicate it.

== See also ==
- Vachellia nilotica subsp. indica
- Tiarosporella urbis-rosarum
- List of Southern African indigenous trees and woody lianes
