= Ascalenia centropselia =

Scientific classification
- Kingdom: Animalia
- Phylum: Arthropoda
- Class: Insecta
- Order: Lepidoptera
- Family: Cosmopterigidae
- Genus: Ascalenia
- Species: A. centropselia

Binomial name
- Ascalenia centropselia Meyrick, 1931

Species of moth

Ascalenia centropselia is a moth in the family Cosmopterigidae. It was described by Edward Meyrick in 1931. It is found in India.
