= Ascalenia imbella =

Scientific classification
- Kingdom: Animalia
- Phylum: Arthropoda
- Class: Insecta
- Order: Lepidoptera
- Family: Cosmopterigidae
- Genus: Ascalenia
- Species: A. imbella

Binomial name
- Ascalenia imbella Kasy, 1975

Species of moth

Ascalenia imbella is a moth in the family Cosmopterigidae. It was described by Kasy in 1975. It is found in southern Iran.

The wingspan is 8–8.7 mm (0.31–0.34 in).

== Bibliography ==
- Natural History Museum Lepidoptera generic names catalog
