= Stagmatophora basanistis =

Scientific classification
- Kingdom: Animalia
- Phylum: Arthropoda
- Class: Insecta
- Order: Lepidoptera
- Family: Cosmopterigidae
- Genus: Stagmatophora
- Species: S. basanistis

Binomial name
- Stagmatophora basanistis Meyrick, 1909

Species of moth

Stagmatophora basanistis is a moth in the family Cosmopterigidae. It is found in South Africa.
