= Gisilia gielisi =

Scientific classification
- Kingdom: Animalia
- Phylum: Arthropoda
- Clade: Pancrustacea
- Class: Insecta
- Order: Lepidoptera
- Family: Cosmopterigidae
- Genus: Gisilia
- Species: G. gielisi

Binomial name
- Gisilia gielisi Koster, 2010

Species of moth

Gisilia gielisi is a moth in the family Cosmopterigidae. It was described by Koster in 2010. It is found in the United Arab Emirates.
