= Ascalenia echidnias =

Scientific classification
- Kingdom: Animalia
- Phylum: Arthropoda
- Class: Insecta
- Order: Lepidoptera
- Family: Cosmopterigidae
- Genus: Ascalenia
- Species: A. echidnias

Binomial name
- Ascalenia echidnias (Meyrick, 1891)

Synonyms
- Elachista echidnias Meyrick, 1891; Ascalenia oranella D. Lucas, 1939; Ascalenia satellita Gozmany, 1960; Ascalenia signatella Chretien, 1915

Species of moth

Ascalenia echidnias is a moth in the family Cosmopterigidae. It is found on Madeira, Sardinia and Malta and from North Africa to Asia Minor and Iran. The habitat consists of dry or desert-like areas.

The wingspan is about 9 mm (0.35 in). Adults have been recorded from April to June and from September to October.
