= Ascalenia jerichoella =

Scientific classification
- Domain: Eukaryota
- Kingdom: Animalia
- Phylum: Arthropoda
- Class: Insecta
- Order: Lepidoptera
- Family: Cosmopterigidae
- Genus: Ascalenia
- Species: A. jerichoella

Binomial name
- Ascalenia jerichoella (Amsel, 1935)

Synonyms
- Elachista jerichoella Amsel, 1935

Species of moth

Ascalenia jerichoella is a moth in the family Cosmopterigidae. It is found in Israel.

The wingspan is about 6 millimetres (0.24 in). Adults have been recorded in May.
