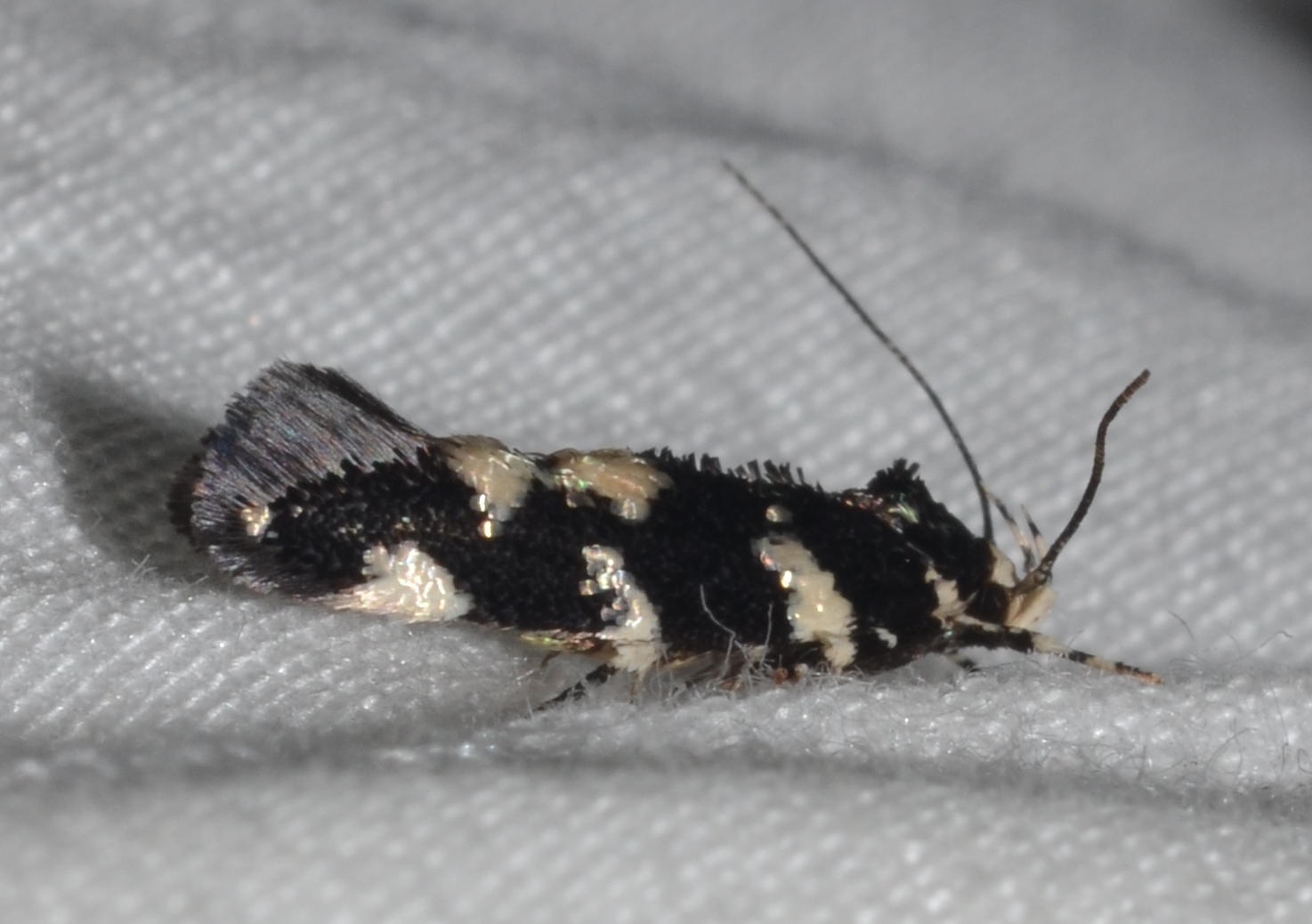
- Stagmatophora wyattella

Scientific classification
- Kingdom: Animalia
- Phylum: Arthropoda
- Class: Insecta
- Order: Lepidoptera
- Family: Cosmopterigidae
- Subfamily: Chrysopeleiinae
- Genus: Stagmatophora; Herrich-Schaffer, 1853

= Stagmatophora =

Genus of moths

Stagmatophora is a genus of moths in the family Cosmopterigidae.

== Species ==
- Stagmatophora acanthodes
- Stagmatophora basanistis
- Stagmatophora chopardella
- Stagmatophora clinarcha
- Stagmatophora diakonoffi
- Stagmatophora diversoplaga
- Stagmatophora erebinthia
- Stagmatophora flexa
- Stagmatophora heydeniella (Fischer von Röslerstamm, 1838)
- Stagmatophora haploceros Turner, 1926
- Stagmatophora luciliella
- Stagmatophora niphocrana
- Stagmatophora notoleuca
- Stagmatophora phalacra Meyrick, 1909
- Stagmatophora pilana
- Stagmatophora tetradesma
- Stagmatophora trimitra
- Stagmatophora wyattella Barnes & Busck, 1920

S. spintheropa probably belongs in Asymphorodes.

== Status unclear ==
- Stagmatophora argyroela Walsingham, 1907
