= Ascalenia liparophanes =

Scientific classification
- Kingdom: Animalia
- Phylum: Arthropoda
- Class: Insecta
- Order: Lepidoptera
- Family: Cosmopterigidae
- Genus: Ascalenia
- Species: A. liparophanes

Binomial name
- Ascalenia liparophanes Meyrick, 1932

Species of moth

Ascalenia liparophanes is a moth in the family Cosmopterigidae. It was described by Edward Meyrick in 1932. It is found on Java in Indonesia.
