= Stagmatophora acanthodes =

Scientific classification
- Kingdom: Animalia
- Phylum: Arthropoda
- Class: Insecta
- Order: Lepidoptera
- Family: Cosmopterigidae
- Genus: Stagmatophora
- Species: S. acanthodes

Binomial name
- Stagmatophora acanthodes Meyrick, 1933

Species of moth

Stagmatophora acanthodes is a moth in the family Cosmopterigidae. It is found in India.
