= Ascalenia molifera =

Scientific classification
- Kingdom: Animalia
- Phylum: Arthropoda
- Class: Insecta
- Order: Lepidoptera
- Family: Cosmopterigidae
- Genus: Ascalenia
- Species: A. molifera

Binomial name
- Ascalenia molifera (Meyrick, 1915)

Synonyms
- Cholotis molifera Meyrick, 1915

Species of moth

Ascalenia molifera is a moth in the family Cosmopterigidae. It was described by Edward Meyrick in 1915. It is found in Sri Lanka.
