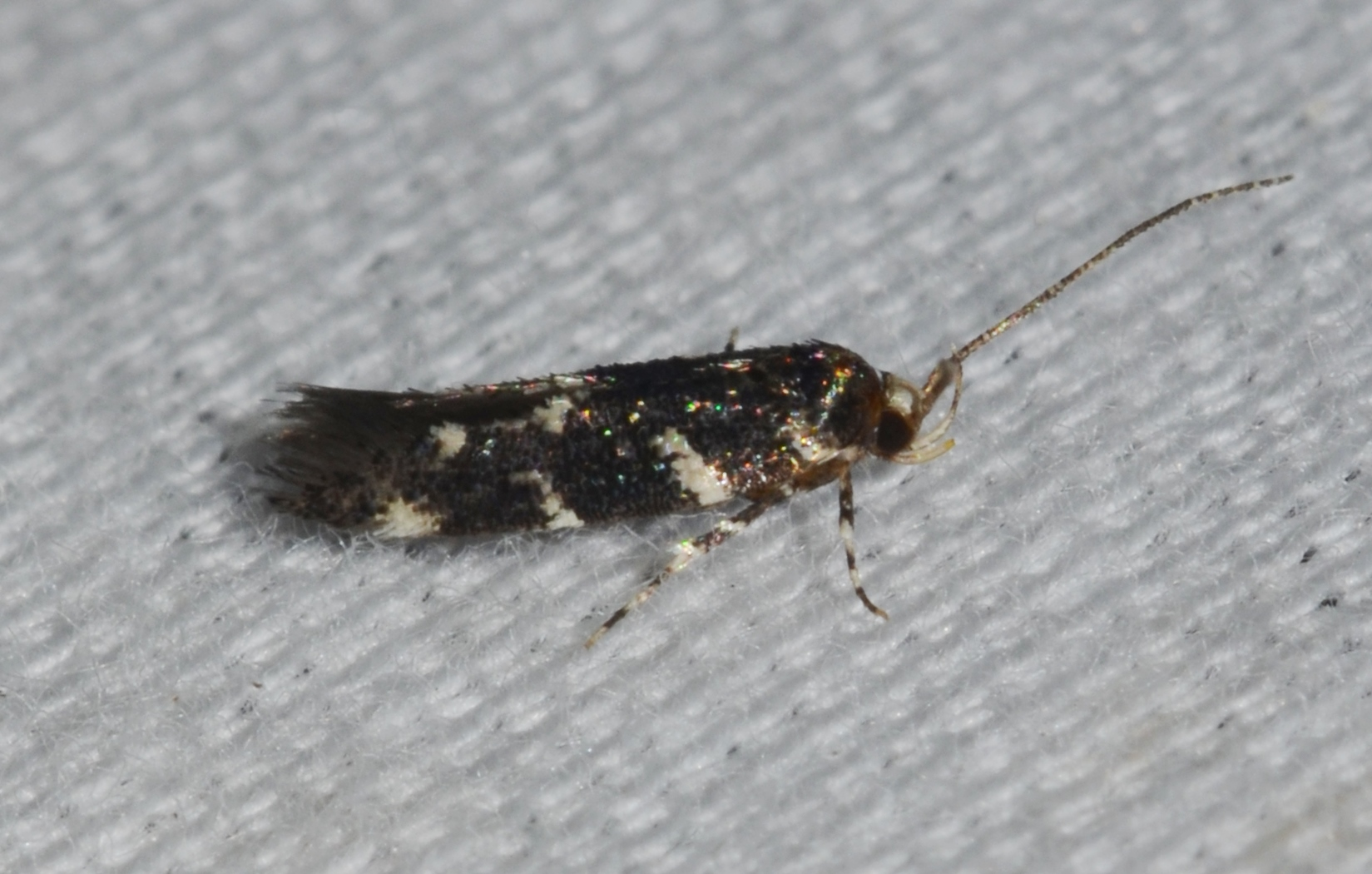

Scientific classification
- Domain: Eukaryota
- Kingdom: Animalia
- Phylum: Arthropoda
- Class: Insecta
- Order: Lepidoptera
- Family: Cosmopterigidae
- Genus: Stagmatophora
- Species: S. wyattella

Binomial name
- Stagmatophora wyattella Barnes & Busck, 1920

Synonyms
- Eteobalea wyattella

= Stagmatophora wyattella =

Species of moth

Stagmatophora wyattella, or Wyatt's stagmatophora moth, is a moth in the family Cosmopterigidae. The species was first described by William Barnes and August Busck in 1920. It is found in the US states of Maine, Ohio, Iowa, Kentucky, Michigan, Mississippi and Oklahoma.

The wingspan is about 14 mm.
