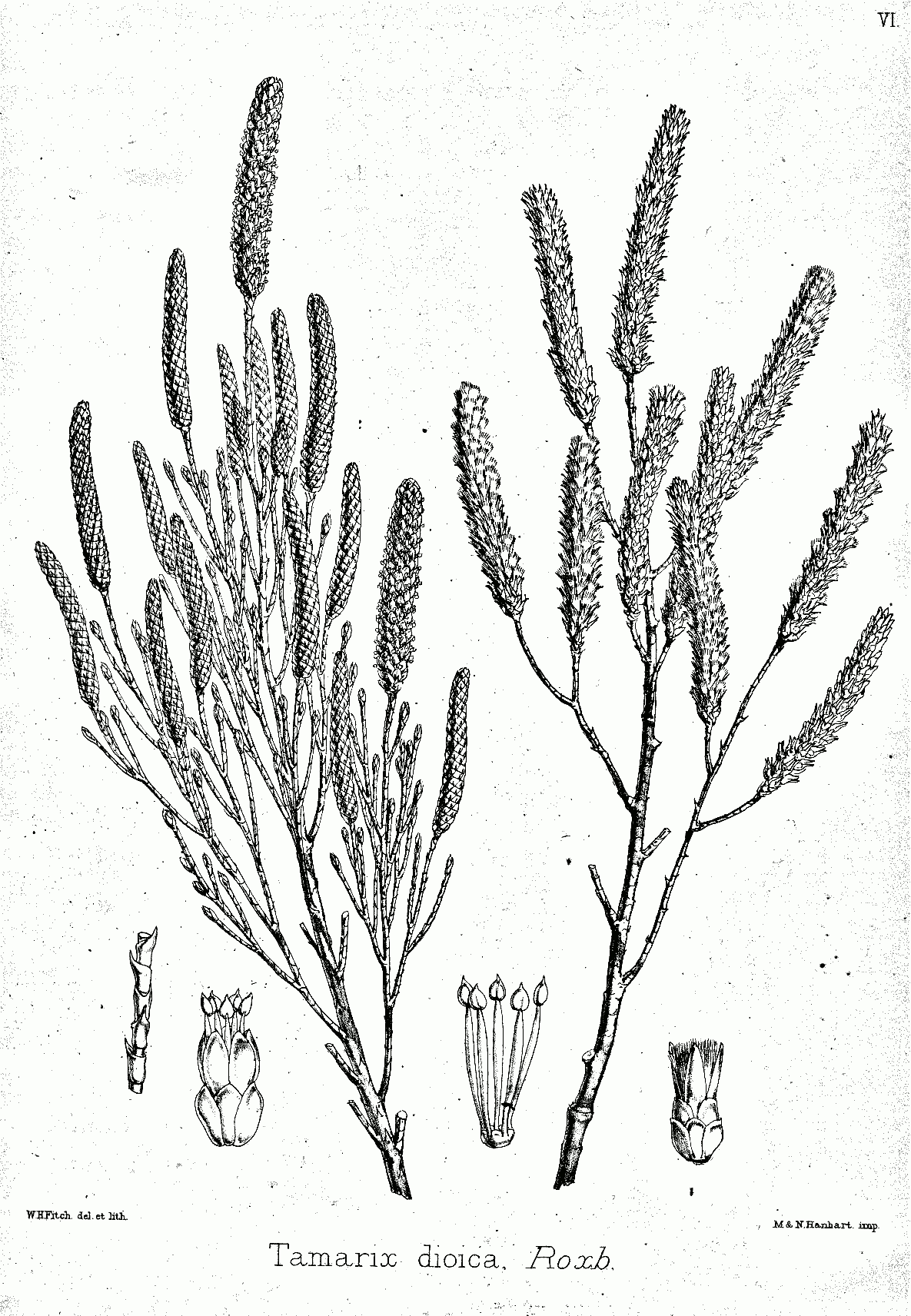

Scientific classification
- Kingdom: Plantae
- Clade: Tracheophytes
- Clade: Angiosperms
- Clade: Eudicots
- Order: Caryophyllales
- Family: Tamaricaceae
- Genus: Tamarix
- Species: T. dioica

Binomial name
- Tamarix dioica Roxb. ex Roth

Synonyms
- Tamarix gallica Wight.

= Tamarix dioica =

Species of plant

Tamarix dioica is a twiggy shrub or small tree that grows in saline habitats in western Asia. Common names include ghaz and khagal in Pakistan, lal jhau, urusia, ban jhau, nona-gach, urichiya in Bangladesh and nona jhau in the Sunderbans.

== Description ==
Tamarix dioica is a shrub or small tree with reddish bark which grows to a maximum height of 6 m (20 ft). The leaves are greyish-green, tiny and scale-like, overlapping each other along the stem. Male and female flowers grow on separate plants. The inflorescences are racemes up to 8 cm (3 in) long with pink or purple flowers

== Distribution and habitat ==
Tamarix dioica is native to Iran, Afghanistan, Pakistan, India, Nepal, Bangladesh and Burma. It is one of the dominant plants of dwarf semi-shrub desert vegetation in flood plains and dry riverbeds where it occurs in association with Salvadora persica and Vachellia nilotica subsp. indica.

== Uses ==
Tamarix dioica is used in traditional medicine as a diuretic and a carminative, as an astringent, and for the treatment of inflammation of the liver and spleen. An extract of the leaves has been shown to have antifungal activity. Phytochemical screening reveals the presence of several unusual phytochemicals and further investigation needs to be undertaken to determine whether any of these are a potential source of useful drugs.
