= Gisilia meyi =

Scientific classification
- Kingdom: Animalia
- Phylum: Arthropoda
- Clade: Pancrustacea
- Class: Insecta
- Order: Lepidoptera
- Family: Cosmopterigidae
- Genus: Gisilia
- Species: G. meyi

Binomial name
- Gisilia meyi Sinev, 2007

Species of moth

Gisilia meyi is a moth in the family Cosmopterigidae. It was described by Sinev in 2007.Type locality: Namibia, Brandberg, Mason Shelter, 1740 m. It is found in Namibia.
