= Ascalenia scotochalca =

Scientific classification
- Kingdom: Animalia
- Phylum: Arthropoda
- Class: Insecta
- Order: Lepidoptera
- Family: Cosmopterigidae
- Genus: Ascalenia
- Species: A. scotochalca

Binomial name
- Ascalenia scotochalca Meyrick, 1934

Species of moth

Ascalenia scotochalca is a moth in the family Cosmopterigidae. It was described by Edward Meyrick in 1934. It is found on Java.
