= Ascalenia semnostola =

Scientific classification
- Kingdom: Animalia
- Phylum: Arthropoda
- Class: Insecta
- Order: Lepidoptera
- Family: Cosmopterigidae
- Genus: Ascalenia
- Species: A. semnostola

Binomial name
- Ascalenia semnostola (Meyrick, 1897)

Synonyms
- Pyroderces semnostola Meyrick, 1897; Cholotis semnostola

Species of moth

Ascalenia semnostola is a moth in the family Cosmopterigidae. It was described by Edward Meyrick in 1897. It was described from the Australian state of New South Wales, but has also been recorded from South Africa.

This species feeds on Acacia decurrens forming an elongate three-sided chamber with silk. The adults have a wingspan of 8–12 mm.
