= Stagmatophora clinarcha =

Scientific classification
- Kingdom: Animalia
- Phylum: Arthropoda
- Class: Insecta
- Order: Lepidoptera
- Family: Cosmopterigidae
- Genus: Stagmatophora
- Species: S. clinarcha

Binomial name
- Stagmatophora clinarcha Meyrick, 1921

Species of moth

Stagmatophora clinarcha is a moth in the family Cosmopterigidae. It is found in Australia, where it has been recorded from Queensland.
