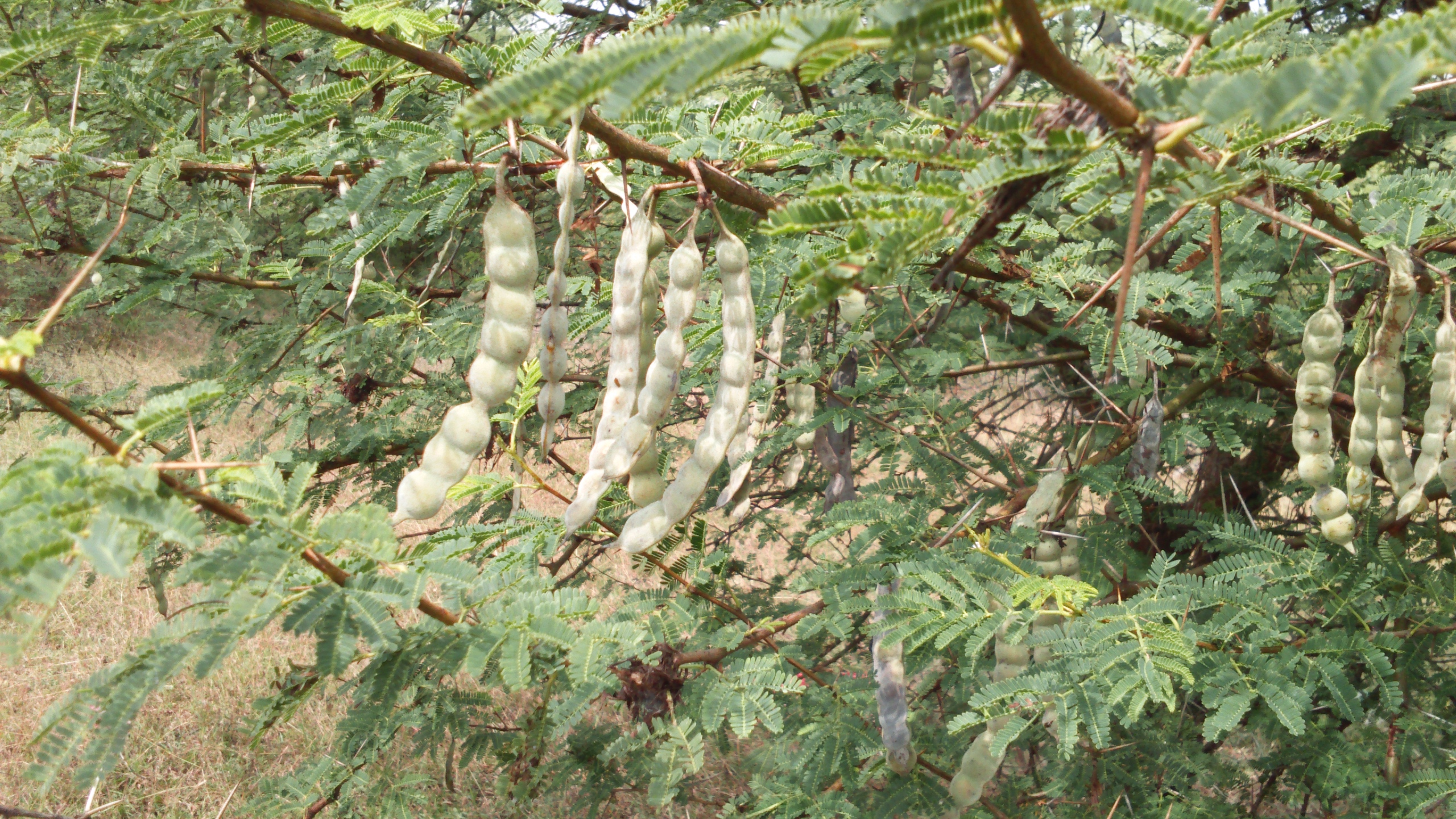

Scientific classification
- Kingdom: Plantae
- Clade: Tracheophytes
- Clade: Angiosperms
- Clade: Eudicots
- Clade: Rosids
- Order: Fabales
- Family: Fabaceae
- Subfamily: Caesalpinioideae
- Clade: Mimosoid clade
- Genus: Vachellia
- Species: V. nilotica
- Subspecies: V. n. subsp. adstringens

Trinomial name
- Vachellia nilotica subsp. adstringens (Schumach. & Thonn.) Kyal. & Boatwr.

Synonyms
- Acacia adansonii Guill. & Perr.; Acacia adstringens (Schumach. & Thonn.) Berhaut; Acacia arabica (Lam.) Willd. var. adstringens (Schum. & Thonn.) Baker f.; Acacia nilotica subsp. adansonii (Guill. & Perr.) Brenan; Acacia nilotica subsp. adstringens (Schumach. & Thonn.) Roberty; Mimosa adstringens Schum. & Thonn.

= Vachellia nilotica subsp. adstringens =

Subspecies of legume

Vachellia nilotica subsp. adstringens is a perennial tree. It is not listed as being threatened. Some common names for it are cassie, piquants blancs and piquant lulu. Its geographic distribution includes Africa, Asia, the Indian Ocean area and the Middle East.

Vachellia nilotica subsp. adstringens is difficult to tell apart from Vachellia karroo without seeing the seed pods.

== Uses ==
=== Wood ===
The tree's wood heartwood has a density of about 0.945 g/cm^{3} and its sapwood has a density of about 0.827 g/cm^{3}.
