= Ascalenia bifasciella =

Scientific classification
- Domain: Eukaryota
- Kingdom: Animalia
- Phylum: Arthropoda
- Class: Insecta
- Order: Lepidoptera
- Family: Cosmopterigidae
- Genus: Ascalenia
- Species: A. bifasciella

Binomial name
- Ascalenia bifasciella Chrétien, 1915

Synonyms
- Elachista bizonatella Turati, 1930

Species of moth

Ascalenia bifasciella is a moth in the family Cosmopterigidae. It is found in North Africa.

The wingspan is 7–10 millimetres (0.28–0.39 in). Adults have been recorded on wing from April to June.
