= Ascalenia antiqua =

Scientific classification
- Kingdom: Animalia
- Phylum: Arthropoda
- Class: Insecta
- Order: Lepidoptera
- Family: Cosmopterigidae
- Genus: Ascalenia
- Species: A. antiqua

Binomial name
- Ascalenia antiqua Meyrick, 1925

Species of moth

Ascalenia antiqua is a moth in the family Cosmopterigidae. It is found in Israel and Egypt.

The wingspan is about 10 mm (0.39 in). Adults have been recorded between September and January.

The larvae feed on Tamarix aphylla. They live in galls made by Eriophyes species in the twigs of their host plant. Pupation also takes place in this gall.
