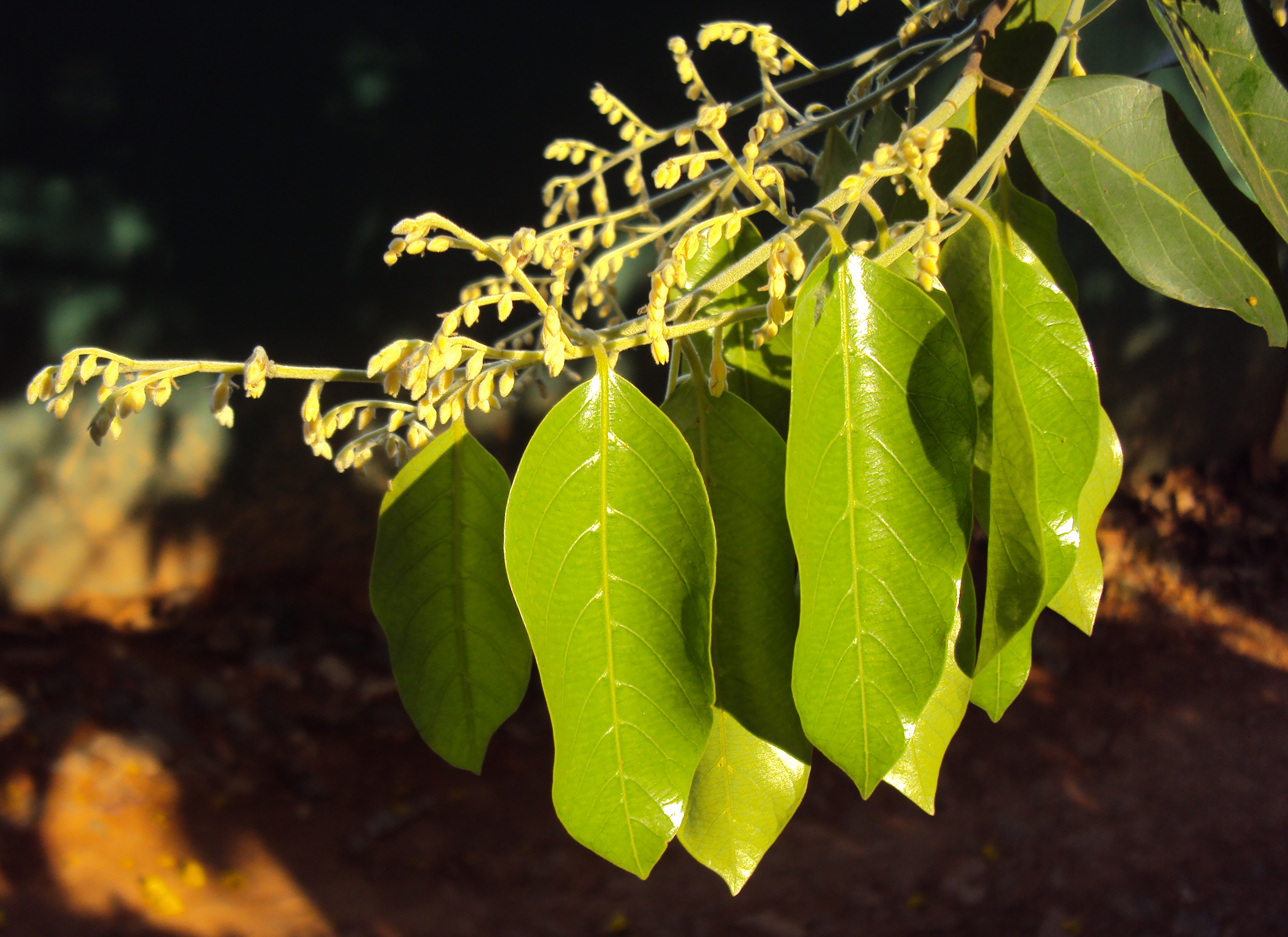
- Leaves and buds

Conservation status
- Least Concern (IUCN 3.1)

Scientific classification
- Kingdom: Plantae
- Clade: Tracheophytes
- Clade: Angiosperms
- Clade: Eudicots
- Clade: Rosids
- Order: Malvales
- Family: Dipterocarpaceae
- Genus: Hopea
- Species: H. indica

Binomial name
- Hopea indica (Raf.) R.Kr.Singh

Synonyms
- Hopea parviflora Bedd.; Neisandra indica Raf. (1838) (basionym)

= Hopea indica =

Species of tree

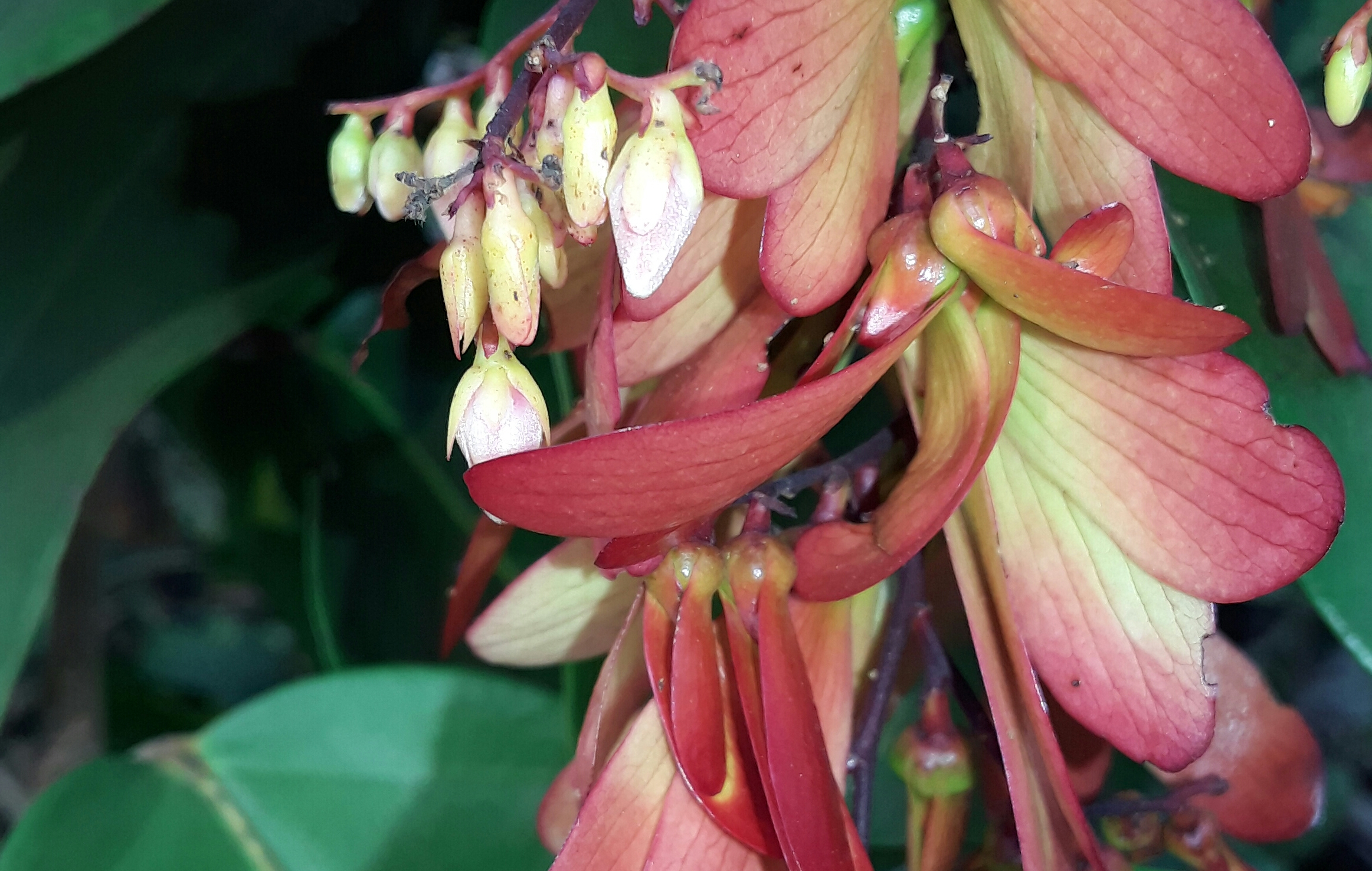
Flowers of Hopea indica with tender leaves. Image from Idayilekkad in Kasargodu, Kerala, India

Hopea indica, commonly known as Malabar ironwood, is a species of flowering plant in the family Dipterocarpaceae. It is a tree endemic to southwestern India. It is called 'kampakam' or 'thampakam' in Malayalam and கோங்கு 'vellaikongu' or 'irubogam' in Tamil.

It is a large emergent tree which grows up to 35 metres tall, with a bole up to 150 cm in diameter. The species flowers and fruits between November and May in some places and from in April to June in other places. It grows gregariously in evergreen, semi-evergreen, and deciduous lowland moist forest below 900 metres elevation in the Malabar coastal plain and Western Ghats of Kerala, Karnataka and Tamil Nadu states. It prefers well-drained soils.

The tree produces a beautiful timber and is commonly harvested from the wild, both for local use and for trade.

The species was first described as Neisandra indica by Constantine Samuel Rafinesque in 1838. In 2023 Rajeev Kumar Singh placed the species in genus Hopea as Hopea indica. Hopea parviflora is a synonym.

== See also ==
- List of Indian timber trees
