= Stagmatophora erebinthia =

Scientific classification
- Kingdom: Animalia
- Phylum: Arthropoda
- Class: Insecta
- Order: Lepidoptera
- Family: Cosmopterigidae
- Genus: Stagmatophora
- Species: S. erebinthia

Binomial name
- Stagmatophora erebinthia Meyrick, 1921

Species of moth

Stagmatophora erebinthia is a moth in the family Cosmopterigidae. It is found on Fiji.
