= Ascalenia exodroma =

Scientific classification
- Kingdom: Animalia
- Phylum: Arthropoda
- Class: Insecta
- Order: Lepidoptera
- Family: Cosmopterigidae
- Genus: Ascalenia
- Species: A. exodroma

Binomial name
- Ascalenia exodroma (Meyrick, 1897)

Synonyms
- Pyroderces exodroma Meyrick, 1897; Cholotis exodroma

Species of moth

Ascalenia exodroma is a moth in the family Cosmopterigidae. It was described by Edward Meyrick in 1897. It is found in Australia, where it has been recorded from Queensland.

This species feeds on spun leaflets of Acacia decurrens. The adults have a wingspan of 7–9 mm (0.28–0.35 in).
