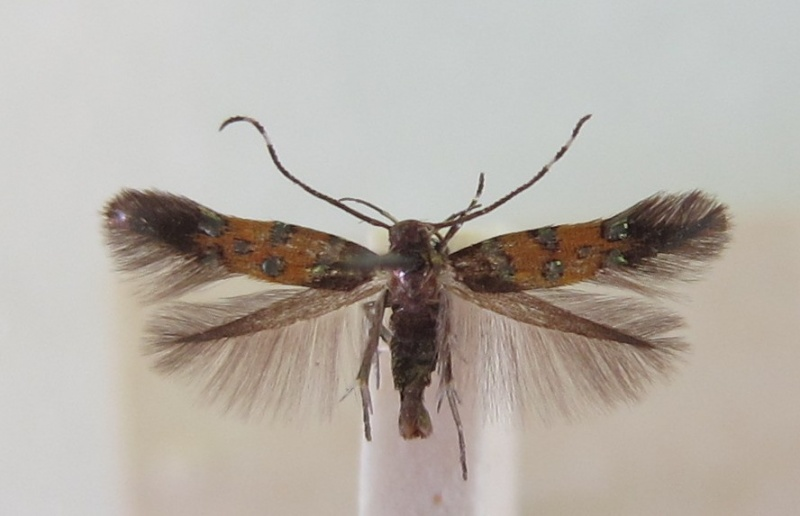

Scientific classification
- Kingdom: Animalia
- Phylum: Arthropoda
- Clade: Pancrustacea
- Class: Insecta
- Order: Lepidoptera
- Family: Cosmopterigidae
- Genus: Stagmatophora
- Species: S. heydeniella

Binomial name
- Stagmatophora heydeniella (Fischer von Röslerstamm, 1838)

Synonyms
- Oecophora heydeniella Fischer von Röslerstamm, 1838; Opostega torquillaepennella Bruand, 1850

= Stagmatophora heydeniella =

Species of moth

Stagmatophora heydeniella is a moth in the family Cosmopterigidae. It is found in France, Germany, Switzerland, Austria, Italy, the Czech Republic, Poland, Slovakia, Hungary, Romania, North Macedonia, Ukraine and Russia.

The wingspan is 7–9 mm. Adults are on wing from May to July.

The larvae feed on Stachys alopecuros, Stachys officinalis and Stachys sylvatica. They mine the leaves of their host plant. Larvae can be found from August to September. The species overwinters in the pupal stage.
