= Ascalenia vanelloides =

Scientific classification
- Domain: Eukaryota
- Kingdom: Animalia
- Phylum: Arthropoda
- Class: Insecta
- Order: Lepidoptera
- Family: Cosmopterigidae
- Genus: Ascalenia
- Species: A. vanelloides

Binomial name
- Ascalenia vanelloides Gerasimov, 1930

Synonyms
- Ascalenia eremella Amsel, 1935

Species of moth

Ascalenia vanelloides is a moth in the family Cosmopterigidae. It is found in Turkey, the Palestinian Territories, Iraq, Iran, Saudi Arabia, Afghanistan, Turkmenistan and Uzbekistan.

The wingspan is 8–10.1 mm. Adults are on wing from April to August, probably in more than one generation per year.

The larvae possibly feed on Prosopis stephaniana.
