= List of Indian timber trees =

There are over 150 species of timber which are produced in India. Following are the chief varieties of timber (trees) which are used for engineering purposes in India:

| Common name | Binomial nomenclature | Colour | Density ¹ | | Location | Characteristics, usage and status |
|---|---|---|---|---|---|---|
| Aini or Aangili | Artocarpus hirsutus | Yellowish brown | 595 kg/m^{3} | 1,003 lb/cu yd | Maharashtra, Andhra Pradesh, Tamil Nadu, Karnataka, Kerala | Elastic, close-grained, and strong. It takes polish. It can be used underwater. It is used for ordinary building construction, structural work, paving, and furniture. |
| Ardu | Ailanthus excelsa | White to pale yellowish | 433 kg/m^{3} | 730 lb/cu yd | Rajasthan, West Bengal, Orissa, Bihar, Andhra Pradesh | It develops straight grained, fairly even and very coarse textured. It can be used for timber, poles, pulp and paper, furniture, fodder, fuel, matchbox making and medicinal purposes. |
| Arjun | Terminalia arjuna Terminalia elliptica | Dark brown | 870 kg/m^{3} | 1,470 lb/cu yd | Central India | It is heavy and strong. It has such uses as beams, rafters, and posts. |
| Axlewood | Anogeissus latifolia | | 930 kg/m^{3} | 1,570 lb/cu yd | Andhra Pradesh, Tamil Nadu, Maharashtra, Madhya Pradesh, Bihar, Uttar Pradesh | It is very strong, hard and tough. It takes a smooth finish. It is subject to cracking. |
| Babul | Acacia nilotica subsp. indica | Whitish red | 835 kg/m^{3} | 1,407 lb/cu yd | Rajasthan, Andhra Pradesh, Maharashtra, Madhya Pradesh, Tamil Nadu, Karnataka, Bengal, Gujarat, Uttar Pradesh | It is strong, hard and tough and it takes up a good polish. It is used for such products as bodies and wheels of bullock cart, agricultural instruments, tool handles, and well curbs. |
| Bakul | Mimusops elengi Mimusops parvifolia | Reddish brown | 880 kg/m^{3} | 1,480 lb/cu yd | Some parts of North India | It is close-grained and tough. It is used for making cabinets. |
| Bamboo | Family Poaceae, tribe Bambuseae | | | | Throughout India, especially Assam and Bengal | Not actually a tree, but a woody grass, it is flexible, very strong and durable. It is used for scaffoldings, thatched roofs, rafters, and temporary bridges. |
| Banyan | Ficus benghalensis | Brown | 580 kg/m^{3} | 980 lb/cu yd | Throughout India | It is strong and durable only under water. The aerial roots are utilized for such items as tent poles and well curbs. |
| Benteak | Lagerstroemia parviflora | | 675 kg/m^{3} | 1,138 lb/cu yd | Kerala, Madras, Maharashtra, Karnataka | It is strong and takes up a smooth surface. It may be used for building constructions, boat building and furniture. |
| Bijasal | Pterocarpus marsupium | Light brown | 800 kg/m^{3} | 1,300 lb/cu yd | Karnataka, Andhra Pradesh, Madhya Pradesh, Maharashtra, Kerala, Uttar Pradesh, Tamil Nadu, Orissa | It is coarse-grained, durable and strong but difficult to work. Termites (also known as white ant) do not easily attack it. It is used for ordinary building construction and for cart wheels. Vulnerable. |
| Casuarina | Casuarina spp. | Reddish brown | 765 kg/m^{3} | 1,289 lb/cu yd | Andhra Pradesh, Tamil Nadu, Kerala (Exotic, originally from Australia) | It grows straight. It is strong and fibrous. It is, however, badly twisted. It is often used for scaffolding and posts for temporary structures. |
| Coconut | Cocos nucifera | Reddish brown | | | Throughout coastal India | Takes polish. Requires preservative treatment. Used as poles, piles, furniture and as formwork in concrete construction. |
| Deodar | Cedrus deodara | Yellowish brown | 560 kg/m^{3} | 940 lb/cu yd | Jammu and Kashmir, Himachal Pradesh and Uttarakhand. | Deodar is the most important timber tree providing soft wood. It can be easily worked and it is moderately strong. It possesses distinct annual rings. It is used for making cheap furniture, railway carriages, railway sleepers, packing boxes, and structural work. |
| Gambar | Gmelina arborea | Pale yellow | 580 kg/m^{3} | 980 lb/cu yd | Central India, South India | It can be easily worked and is strong and durable especially when used under water. It is used for such products as furniture, carriage, well curbs, yokes, and door panels. |
| Hopea | Hopea parviflora | Light to deep brown | 1,010 kg/m^{3} | 1,700 lb/cu yd | Madras, Kerala | Hopea is extremely strong and tough. It is difficult to work. However, it can be seasoned easily and it is durable and not likely to be damaged by white ants. It has been variously used for ordinary house construction, railway sleepers, piles, and boat building. Endangered. |
| Himalayan Elm, Indian Elm | Ulmus wallichiana | Red | 960 kg/m^{3} | 1,620 lb/cu yd | Throughout India | It is moderately hard and strong. It is used for door and window frames, and carts. |
| Ironwood, Penaga Lilin, Bosneak, Gangaw, Mesua | Mesua ferrea | Reddish brown | 960–1,060 kg/m^{3} | 1,620–1,790 lb/cu yd | | Ironwood is durable though it is very hard and is not easily worked. It even resists penetration of nails. It is used for ordinary house construction, bridges, piles, agricultural instruments, railway wagons, and railway sleepers. |
| Irul, Pyinkado | Xylia xylocarpa | | 830–1,060 kg/m^{3} | 1,400–1,790 lb/cu yd | Karnataka, Kerala, Andhra Pradesh, Maharashtra, Orissa, Tamil Nadu | It is very hard, heavy and durable. Difficult to work, it also requires slow and careful seasoning. It is used for railway sleepers, agricultural instruments, paving blocks, and heavy construction. Least concern. |
| Jack | Mangifera caesia. | Yellow, darkens with age | 595 kg/m^{3} | 1,003 lb/cu yd | Karnataka, Maharashtra, Tamil Nadu, Kerala | It is compact and even grained. It is moderately strong and easy to work. It takes a good finish and maintains its shape well. It has many uses including plain furniture, boat construction, well curbs, door panels, cabinet making and musical instruments. |
| Jarul | Lagerstroemia flos-reginae | Light reddish gray | 640 kg/m^{3} | 1,080 lb/cu yd | Assam, Bengal, Maharashtra | Hard and durable, it can be easily worked. It takes a good finish and is used for house construction, boat building, railway carriages, cart making and scaffolding. |
| Kathal, Keledang, Jackfruit | Artocarpus heterophyllus | Yellow to deep brown | 800 kg/m^{3} | 1,300 lb/cu yd | Karnataka, Andhra Pradesh, Kerala, Maharashtra, Tamil Nadu | It is heavy and hard. It is durable under water and in damp conditions, however, it cracks if exposed to direct sun. White ants do not attack it. It is used for piles, platforms of wooden bridges, door and window panels. |
| Lauraceae, Saj | Lauraceae | Dark brown | 880 kg/m^{3} | 1,480 lb/cu yd | Karnataka, Andhra Pradesh, Bihar, Orissa, Madhya Pradesh, Kerala, Tamil Nadu | It is strong, hard and tough. It is subject to cracking and attack by dry rot. White ants do not attack it. It takes a smooth finish. It is used for such purposes as house construction, boat construction, railway sleepers and structural work. |
| Mahogany | Swietenia spp. | Reddish brown | 720 kg/m^{3} | 1,210 lb/cu yd | Kerala, Tamil Nadu, Karnataka, Andhra, Bengal (Exotic, originally from Jamaica) | It takes a good polish and is easily worked. It is durable under water. It is most commonly used for furniture, pattern making and cabinet work. |
| Mango | Mangifera spp | Deep gray | 560–720 kg/m^{3} | 940–1,210 lb/cu yd | Throughout India | The mango tree is well known for its fruits. It is easy to work and it maintains its shape well. It is moderately strong. It is most often used for cheap furniture, toys, packing boxes, cabinet work, panels for doors and for windows. |
| Mulberry | Morus spp. | Brown | 650 kg/m^{3} | 1,100 lb/cu yd | Punjab | It is strong, tough and elastic. It takes up a clean finish. It can be well seasoned. It is turned and carved easily. Mulberry is typically used for baskets and sports goods like hockey sticks, tennis rackets and cricket bats. |
| Oak | Quercus spp. | Yellowish brown | 865 kg/m^{3} | 1,458 lb/cu yd | | Oak is strong and durable, with straight silvery grain. It is used for preparing sporting goods. |
| Palm | Arecaceae | Dark brown | 1,040 kg/m^{3} | 1,750 lb/cu yd | Throughout India | It contains ripe wood in the outer crust. The colour of this ripened wood is dark brown. It is strong, durable and fibrous. Palm is used for furniture, roof covering, rafters and joists. |
| Pine | Pinus spp. | | | | | Pine wood is hard and tough except white pine which is soft. It decays easily if it comes into contact with soil. It is heavy and coarse grained. It is used for pattern making, frames for doors and windows, and for paving material. White pine is light and straight grained and is used in the manufacture of matches. |
| Red cedar | | Red | 480 kg/m^{3} | 810 lb/cu yd | Assam, Nagpur | It is soft and even grained. It is used for furniture, door panels and well curbs. |
| Rosewood | Dalbergia latifolia | Dark | 850 kg/m^{3} | 1,430 lb/cu yd | Kerala, Karnataka, Maharashtra, Madhya Pradesh, Tamil Nadu, Orrissa | It is strong, tough and close-grained. It is a handsome wood that takes up a high polish. It maintains its shape well and is available in large sizes. It is used for furniture of superior quality, cabinet work, and ornamental carvings. Vulnerable. |
| Sal | Shorea robusta | Brown | 880–1,050 kg/m^{3} | 1,480–1,770 lb/cu yd | Karnataka, Andhra Pradesh, Maharashtra, Uttar Pradesh, Bihar, Madhya Pradesh, Orissa, Jharkhand, Chhattisgarh | It is hard, fibrous and close-grained. It does not take up a good polish. It requires slow and careful seasoning. It is durable under ground and water. It is used for railway sleepers, shipbuilding, and bridges. |
| Sandalwood | Santalum spp. | White or Red | 930 kg/m^{3} | 1,570 lb/cu yd | Karnataka, Tamil Nadu, Kerala, Assam, Nagpur, Bengal | It has a pleasant smell. It is commonly used for agricultural instruments, well curbs, wheels, and mallets. Vulnerable. |
| Satinwood | Chloroxylon swietenia | Yellow | 960 kg/m^{3} | 1,620 lb/cu yd | Central and Southern India | It is very hard and durable. It is close grained. It is used for furniture and other ornamental works. Vulnerable. |
| Simul | Bombax spp. | White | 450 kg/m^{3} | 760 lb/cu yd | All over India | It is a loose grained, inferior quality wood. Light in weight, it is used for packing cases, the match industry, well curbs, and for cheap furniture. |
| Siris | Albizia spp. | Dark brown | | | North India | Hard and durable, Siris wood is difficult to work. It is used for well curbs in salty water, beams, posts, and furniture. |
| Sissoo | Dalbergia sissoo | Yellowish white | 770 kg/m^{3} | 1,300 lb/cu yd | Mysore, Maharashtra, Assam, Bengal, Uttar Pradesh, Orissa | Also known as shisham or tali, this wood is strong and tough. It is durable and handsome and it maintains its shape well. It can be easily seasoned. It is difficult to work but it takes a fine polish. It is used for high quality furniture, plywoods, bridge piles, sport goods, and railway sleepers. It is a very good material for decorative works and carvings. |
| Spruce | Picea spp. | | 480 kg/m^{3} | 810 lb/cu yd | | Spruce wood resists decay and is not affected by the attack of marine borers. It is however liable to shrink, twist and warp. It is used for piles under water and (formerly) for aeroplane construction. |
| Sundri | Heritiera fomes | Dark red | 960 kg/m^{3} | 1,620 lb/cu yd | Bengal | It is hard and tough. It is difficult to season and work. It is elastic and close grained. It is strong and durable. These qualities make it suited for such uses as boat building, piles, poles, tool handles, and carriage shafts. |
| Tamarind | Tamarindus indica | Dark brown | 1,300 kg/m^{3} | 2,200 lb/cu yd | All over India | Tamarind is knotty and durable. It is a beautiful tree for avenue and gardens. Its development is very slow but it ultimately forms a massive appearance. Its fruit is also very useful. It is used for agricultural instruments, well curbs, sugar mills, carts and brick burning. |
| Teak | Tectona grandis | Deep yellow to dark brown | 639 kg/m^{3} | 1,077 lb/cu yd | Central India and Southern India | Moderately hard, teak is durable and fire-resistant. It can be easily seasoned and worked. It takes up a good polish and is not attacked by white ants and dry rot. It does not corrode iron fastenings and it shrinks little. It is among the most valuable timber trees of the world and its use is limited to superior work only. |
| Toon, red cedar | Toona ciliata | Reddish brown or dull red | 450 kg/m^{3} | 760 lb/cu yd | Assam | It can be easily worked. It is light in weight. It is used for such products as furniture, packing boxes, cabinet making and door panels. |

¹ After seasoning at 12% moisture content

Poplar

== Indian Mangrove ==
- Agati
- Algaroba
- Arni
- Ashok
- Asian Bushbeech
- Badminton Ball Tree
- Batino
- Blackjack Oak
- Bothi
- Brazilian Pepper
- Buddha Coconut
- Cashew
- Caucasian Maple
- Chaste Tree
- Chhal Mogra
- Chironji Tree
- Cinnamon
- Coffee Plum
- Common Sesban
- Common White Frangipani
- Crape Jasmine
- Dandal
- Devil Tree
- East-Indian Screw Tree
- Fiddlewood
- Frangipani pink
- Frangipani red
- Fried Egg Tree
- Gamhar
- Ginkgo
- Governor's Plum
- Guest Tree
- Himalayan Maple
- Himalayan Tree Hydrangea
- Indian Ash Tree
- Indian Bay Leaf
- Indrajao
- Java Olive
- Jerusalem Thorn
- Jhand
- Kakkar
- Kanak Champa
- Large Leaf Looking Glass Tree
- Lobed-leaf Alangium
- Looking Glass Mangrove
- Madagascar Palm
- Mango
- Meda
- Mexican Oleander
- Moulmein Rosewood
- Mountain Sweet Thorn
- Nag Kudagr
- Nelthare
- Netted Custard Apple
- Pale Sterculia
- Parrot's Beak
- Peacock Chaste Tree
- Pisa
- Pongam Tree
- Prickly Padauk
- Rain Tree
- Sage Leaved Alangium
- Scarlet Sterculia
- Sea Mango
- Singkrang
- Spotted Sterculia
- Sugar Apple
- Sweet Chestnut
- Teak
- Tipu Tree
- Tree Bean
- Tree of Life
- West Indian Elm
- White Frangipani
- White Locust Tree
- Wild Mango
- Wild Tamarind
- Woolly Dyeing Rosebay
- Woolly Leaved Oak
- Ylang Ylang

== See also ==
- Flora of the Indian epic period
- Flora of Madhya Pradesh
- Indian Council of Forestry Research and Education
