= Ascalenia pseudofusella =

Scientific classification
- Kingdom: Animalia
- Phylum: Arthropoda
- Clade: Pancrustacea
- Class: Insecta
- Order: Lepidoptera
- Family: Cosmopterigidae
- Genus: Ascalenia
- Species: A. pseudofusella

Binomial name
- Ascalenia pseudofusella Legrand, 1965

Species of moth

Ascalenia pseudofusella is a rare species moth in the family Cosmopterigidae. It was described by Henry Legrand in 1965. It is found on the Seychelles.
