= Ascalenia grisella =

Scientific classification
- Domain: Eukaryota
- Kingdom: Animalia
- Phylum: Arthropoda
- Class: Insecta
- Order: Lepidoptera
- Family: Cosmopterigidae
- Genus: Ascalenia
- Species: A. grisella

Binomial name
- Ascalenia grisella Kuznetzov, 1957

Species of moth

Ascalenia grisella is a moth in the family Cosmopterigidae. It is found in Armenia.

The wingspan is about 9.7 mm (0.38 in).

The larvae feed on Tamarix species, creating a stem gall.
