= Stagmatophora pilana =

Scientific classification
- Kingdom: Animalia
- Phylum: Arthropoda
- Class: Insecta
- Order: Lepidoptera
- Family: Cosmopterigidae
- Genus: Stagmatophora
- Species: S. pilana

Binomial name
- Stagmatophora pilana Meyrick, 1913

Species of moth

Stagmatophora pilana is a moth in the family Cosmopterigidae first described by Edward Meyrick in 1913. It is found in South Africa.

The wingspan is about 13 mm. The forewings are dark purplish fuscous with a slender irregular white streak along the dorsum from the base to beyond the tornus, posteriorly partially suffused with brownish ochreous, edged above by two raised black dots at one-fourth, and at the middle of the wing, the second edged anteriorly with white. There is a short black apical dash, partially edged above with white. The hindwings are grey, thinly scaled towards the base.
