= Eutiarosporella urbis-rosarum =

Scientific classification
- Kingdom: Fungi
- Division: Ascomycota
- Class: Dothideomycetes
- Order: Botryosphaeriales
- Family: Botryosphaeriaceae
- Genus: Eutiarosporella
- Species: E. urbis-rosarum

Binomial name
- Eutiarosporella urbis-rosarum (Jami, Gryzenh., Slippers & M.J. Wingf.) Crous (2015)

Synonyms
- Tiarosporella urbis-rosarum Jami, Gryzenh., Slippers & M.J. Wingf. (2012)

Species of fungus

Eutiarosporella urbis-rosarum is an endophytic fungus that might be a latent pathogen. It was found on Acacia karroo, a common tree in southern Africa.
