= Ascalenia subusta =

Scientific classification
- Kingdom: Animalia
- Phylum: Arthropoda
- Class: Insecta
- Order: Lepidoptera
- Family: Cosmopterigidae
- Genus: Ascalenia
- Species: A. subusta

Binomial name
- Ascalenia subusta Meyrick, 1921

Species of moth

Ascalenia subusta is a moth in the family Cosmopterigidae. It was described by Edward Meyrick in 1921. It is found on Java in Indonesia.
