= Stagmatophora diversoplaga =

Scientific classification
- Domain: Eukaryota
- Kingdom: Animalia
- Phylum: Arthropoda
- Class: Insecta
- Order: Lepidoptera
- Family: Cosmopterigidae
- Genus: Stagmatophora
- Species: S. diversoplaga

Binomial name
- Stagmatophora diversoplaga Legrand, 1966

Species of moth

Stagmatophora diversoplaga is a moth in the family Cosmopterigidae. It is found on the Seychelles.
