= Stagmatophora trimitra =

Scientific classification
- Kingdom: Animalia
- Phylum: Arthropoda
- Class: Insecta
- Order: Lepidoptera
- Family: Cosmopterigidae
- Genus: Stagmatophora
- Species: S. trimitra

Binomial name
- Stagmatophora trimitra Meyrick, 1913

Synonyms
- Stagmatophora trimetra Vári, 1958

Species of moth

Stagmatophora trimitra is a moth in the family Cosmopterigidae first described by Edward Meyrick in 1913. It is found in South Africa.

The wingspan is 9–10 millimetres (0.35–0.39 in). The forewings are very dark bronzy fuscous with a short silvery-white streak from the base of the costa along the submedian fold, as well as three fine silvery-white transverse fasciae, the first at one-fourth, somewhat oblique, the second median, direct, the third at three-fourths direct, but with the extremities produced outwards in the cilia. There is also a silvery-white apical dot. The hindwings are dark fuscous.
