= Ascalenia beieri =

Scientific classification
- Domain: Eukaryota
- Kingdom: Animalia
- Phylum: Arthropoda
- Class: Insecta
- Order: Lepidoptera
- Family: Cosmopterigidae
- Genus: Ascalenia
- Species: A. beieri

Binomial name
- Ascalenia beieri Kasy, 1968

Species of moth

Ascalenia beieri is a moth in the family Cosmopterigidae. It was described by Kasy in 1968. It is found in Sudan.
