= Stagmatophora niphocrana =

Scientific classification
- Domain: Eukaryota
- Kingdom: Animalia
- Phylum: Arthropoda
- Class: Insecta
- Order: Lepidoptera
- Family: Cosmopterigidae
- Genus: Stagmatophora
- Species: S. niphocrana

Binomial name
- Stagmatophora niphocrana Turner, 1926

Species of moth

Stagmatophora niphocrana is a moth in the family Cosmopterigidae. It is found in Australia, where it has been recorded from Queensland.
