= Stagmatophora tetradesma =

Scientific classification
- Kingdom: Animalia
- Phylum: Arthropoda
- Class: Insecta
- Order: Lepidoptera
- Family: Cosmopterigidae
- Genus: Stagmatophora
- Species: S. tetradesma

Binomial name
- Stagmatophora tetradesma (Meyrick, 1897)

Synonyms
- Pyroderces tetradesma Meyrick, 1897

Species of moth

Stagmatophora tetradesma is a species of moth in the family Cosmopterigidae. It is found in Australia, where it has been recorded from Western Australia.
