= Gisilia =

Scientific classification
- Domain: Eukaryota
- Kingdom: Animalia
- Phylum: Arthropoda
- Class: Insecta
- Order: Lepidoptera
- Family: Cosmopterigidae
- Subfamily: Chrysopeleiinae
- Genus: Gisilia; Kasy, 1968

Genus of moths

Gisilia is a genus of moths in the family Cosmopterigidae.

== Species ==
- Gisilia alfieriella (Rebel, 1927)
- Gisilia antidesma (Meyrick, 1913)
- Gisilia cardinata (Meyrick, 1918)
- Gisilia conformata (Meyrick, 1921)
- Gisilia gielisi Koster, 2010
- Gisilia lerautella Gibeaux, 1986
- Gisilia meyi Sinev, 2007
- Gisilia sclerodes (Meyrick, 1909)
- Gisilia stagnans (Meyrick, 1921)
- Gisilia stereodoxa (Meyrick, 1925)
- Gisilia subcrocea Meyrick, 1923
