= Ascalenia vadata =

Scientific classification
- Kingdom: Animalia
- Phylum: Arthropoda
- Class: Insecta
- Order: Lepidoptera
- Family: Cosmopterigidae
- Genus: Ascalenia
- Species: A. vadata

Binomial name
- Ascalenia vadata Meyrick, 1922

Species of moth

Ascalenia vadata is a moth in the family Cosmopterigidae. It was described by Edward Meyrick in 1922 and it can currently be found in Peru.
