= Ascalenia pulverata =

Scientific classification
- Kingdom: Animalia
- Phylum: Arthropoda
- Class: Insecta
- Order: Lepidoptera
- Family: Cosmopterigidae
- Genus: Ascalenia
- Species: A. pulverata

Binomial name
- Ascalenia pulverata (Meyrick, 1913)

Synonyms
- Cholotis pulverata Meyrick, 1913

Species of moth

Ascalenia pulverata is a moth in the family Cosmopterigidae. It is found in South Africa.
