= Ascalenia archaica =

Scientific classification
- Kingdom: Animalia
- Phylum: Arthropoda
- Class: Insecta
- Order: Lepidoptera
- Family: Cosmopterigidae
- Genus: Ascalenia
- Species: A. archaica

Binomial name
- Ascalenia archaica (Meyrick, 1917)

Synonyms
- Cholotis archaica Meyrick, 1917

Species of moth

Ascalenia archaica is a moth in the family Cosmopterigidae. It was described by Edward Meyrick in 1917. It is found in Sri Lanka.
