= Ascalenia staurocentra =

Scientific classification
- Kingdom: Animalia
- Phylum: Arthropoda
- Clade: Pancrustacea
- Class: Insecta
- Order: Lepidoptera
- Family: Cosmopterigidae
- Genus: Ascalenia
- Species: A. staurocentra

Binomial name
- Ascalenia staurocentra (Meyrick, 1915)

Synonyms
- Cholotis staurocentra Meyrick, 1915

Species of moth

Ascalenia staurocentra is a moth in the family Cosmopterigidae. It is found in South Africa.
