= Ascalenia epicrypta =

Scientific classification
- Kingdom: Animalia
- Phylum: Arthropoda
- Class: Insecta
- Order: Lepidoptera
- Family: Cosmopterigidae
- Genus: Ascalenia
- Species: A. epicrypta

Binomial name
- Ascalenia epicrypta (Meyrick, 1915)

Synonyms
- Cholotis epicrypta Meyrick, 1915

Species of moth

Ascalenia epicrypta is a moth in the family Cosmopterigidae. It was described by Edward Meyrick in 1915. It is found in India.
