= Gisilia conformata =

Scientific classification
- Kingdom: Animalia
- Phylum: Arthropoda
- Class: Insecta
- Order: Lepidoptera
- Family: Cosmopterigidae
- Genus: Gisilia
- Species: G. conformata

Binomial name
- Gisilia conformata (Meyrick, 1921)

Synonyms
- Ascalenia conformata Meyrick, 1921

Species of moth

Gisilia conformata is a moth in the family Cosmopterigidae. It is found in Kenya, Namibia and South Africa.

This species has a wingspan of 8 mm, its forewings are whitish-grey-ochreous speckled with black.
