= Gisilia antidesma =

Scientific classification
- Kingdom: Animalia
- Phylum: Arthropoda
- Class: Insecta
- Order: Lepidoptera
- Family: Cosmopterigidae
- Genus: Gisilia
- Species: G. antidesma

Binomial name
- Gisilia antidesma (Meyrick, 1913)

Synonyms
- Limnoecia antidesma Meyrick, 1913; Ascalenia antidesma

Species of moth

Gisilia antidesma is a moth in the family Cosmopterigidae. It is found in South Africa.
