= Stagmatophora phalacra =

Scientific classification
- Kingdom: Animalia
- Phylum: Arthropoda
- Class: Insecta
- Order: Lepidoptera
- Family: Cosmopterigidae
- Genus: Stagmatophora
- Species: S. phalacra

Binomial name
- Stagmatophora phalacra Meyrick, 1909

Synonyms
- Ascalenia phalacra; Cholotis phalacra

Species of moth

Stagmatophora phalacra is a moth in the family Cosmopterigidae. It was described by Edward Meyrick in 1909. It is found in South Africa.
