= Gisilia stagnans =

Scientific classification
- Kingdom: Animalia
- Phylum: Arthropoda
- Class: Insecta
- Order: Lepidoptera
- Family: Cosmopterigidae
- Genus: Gisilia
- Species: G. stagnans

Binomial name
- Gisilia stagnans (Meyrick, 1921)

Synonyms
- Ascalenia stagnans Meyrick, 1921

Species of moth

Gisilia stagnans is a moth in the family Cosmopterigidae. It is found in Namibia and South Africa.
