= Gisilia cardinata =

Scientific classification
- Kingdom: Animalia
- Phylum: Arthropoda
- Clade: Pancrustacea
- Class: Insecta
- Order: Lepidoptera
- Family: Cosmopterigidae
- Genus: Gisilia
- Species: G. cardinata

Binomial name
- Gisilia cardinata (Meyrick, 1918)

Synonyms
- Cholotis cardinata Meyrick, 1918; Ascalenia cardinata

Species of moth

Gisilia cardinata is a moth in the family Cosmopterigidae. It is found in South Africa.
