= Vachellia nilotica subsp. indica =

Scientific classification
- Kingdom: Plantae
- Clade: Tracheophytes
- Clade: Angiosperms
- Clade: Eudicots
- Clade: Rosids
- Order: Fabales
- Family: Fabaceae
- Subfamily: Caesalpinioideae
- Clade: Mimosoid clade
- Genus: Vachellia
- Species: V. nilotica
- Subspecies: V. n. subsp. indica

Trinomial name
- Vachellia nilotica subsp. indica (Benth.) Kyal. & Boatwr.

Synonyms
- Acacia arabica sensu auct.; Acacia arabica var. indica Benth.; Acacia nilotica var. indica (Benth.) A.F.Hill; Acacia nilotica var. indica (Benth.) Brenan

Subspecies of legume

Vachellia nilotica subsp. indica is a perennial tree native to Bangladesh, India, Myanmar, Nepal and Pakistan. It is also cultivated in Angola, Egypt, Ethiopia, and Tanzania. Common names for it include babul, kikar and prickly acacia.

Its uses include chemical products, environmental management, fiber, food and drink, forage, medicine and wood.

== Uses ==
=== Tannin ===
The bark of V. nilotica subsp. indica has a tannin content of greater than 20%. The pods without seeds have a tannin content of about 18–27%.

== Chemical compounds ==
The bark has been found to contain catechin, epicatechin, dicatechin, quercitin, gallic acid and procyanidin.
