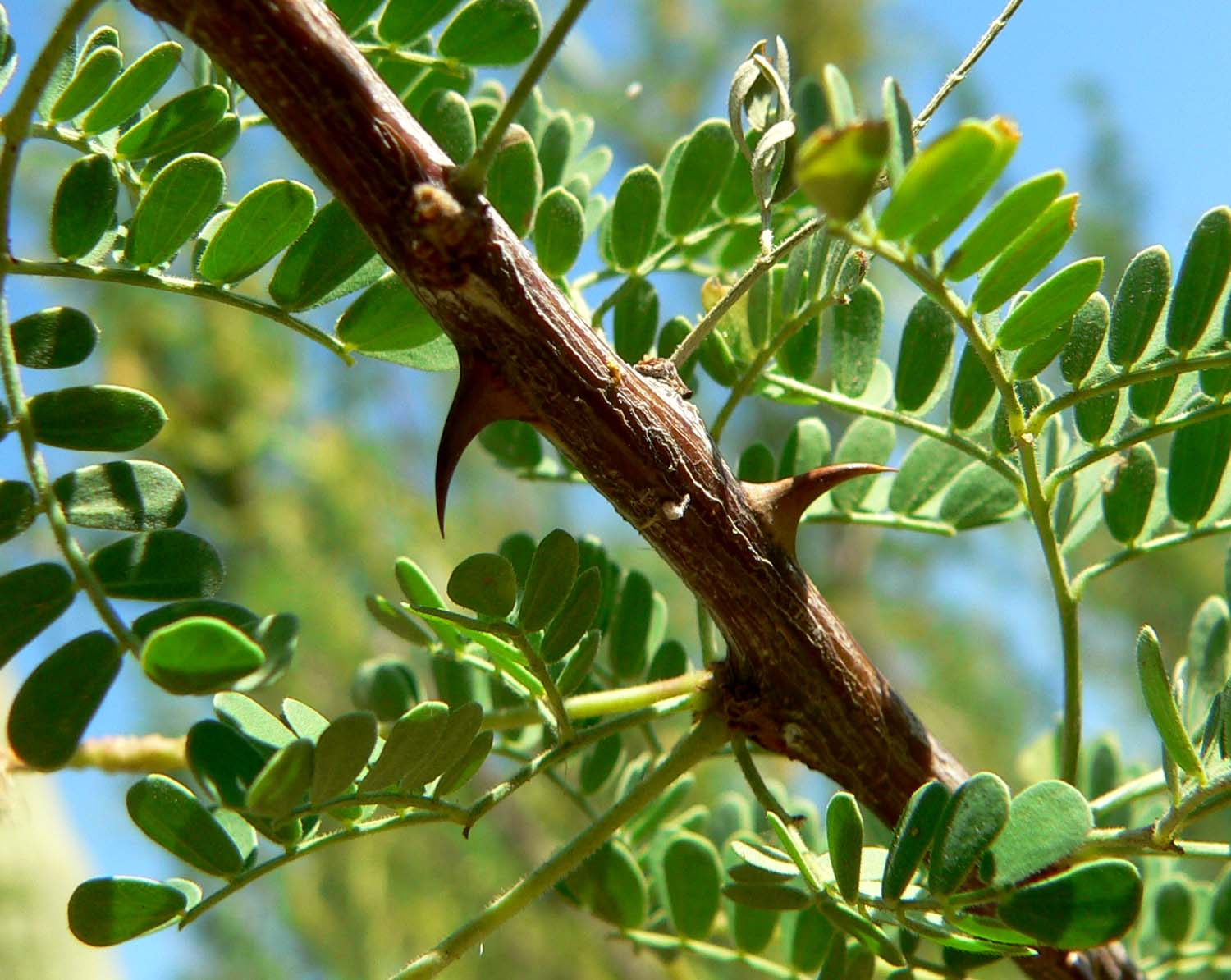
- Senegalia greggii (syn. A. greggii)

Scientific classification
- Kingdom: Plantae
- Clade: Tracheophytes
- Clade: Angiosperms
- Clade: Eudicots
- Clade: Rosids
- Order: Fabales
- Family: Fabaceae
- Subfamily: Caesalpinioideae
- Clade: Mimosoid clade
- Genus: Acacia; Mill.

Type species
- Acacia nilotica (until 2005); Acacia penninervis (post 2005)

Species
- About 1,300; see list of Acacia species

= Acacia sensu lato =

Acacia s.l.

Genus of legumes

Acacia s.l. (pronounced /əˈkeɪʃə/ or /əˈkeɪsiə/), known commonly as mimosa, acacia, thorntree or wattle, is a polyphyletic genus of shrubs and trees belonging to the subfamily Mimosoideae of the family Fabaceae. It was described by the Swedish botanist Carl Linnaeus in 1773 based on the African species Acacia nilotica, now classified as Vachellia nilotica. Many non-Australian species tend to be thorny. Most Australian acacias are not. All species are pod-bearing, with sap and leaves often bearing large amounts of tannins and condensed tannins that historically found use as pharmaceuticals and preservatives.

The genus Acacia constitutes, in its traditional circumspection, the second largest genus in Fabaceae (Astragalus being the largest), with roughly 1,300 species, about 960 of them native to Australia, with the remainder spread around the tropical to warm-temperate regions of both hemispheres, including Europe, Africa, southern Asia, and the Americas (see List of Acacia species). The genus was divided into five separate genera under "Mimosoideae". The genus now called Acacia represents the majority of the Australian species and a few native to Southeast Asia, Réunion, and the Pacific Islands. Most of the species outside Australia, and a small number of Australian species, are classified into Vachellia and Senegalia. The two final genera, Acaciella and Mariosousa, each contain about a dozen species from the Americas (but see "Classification" below for the ongoing debate concerning their taxonomy).

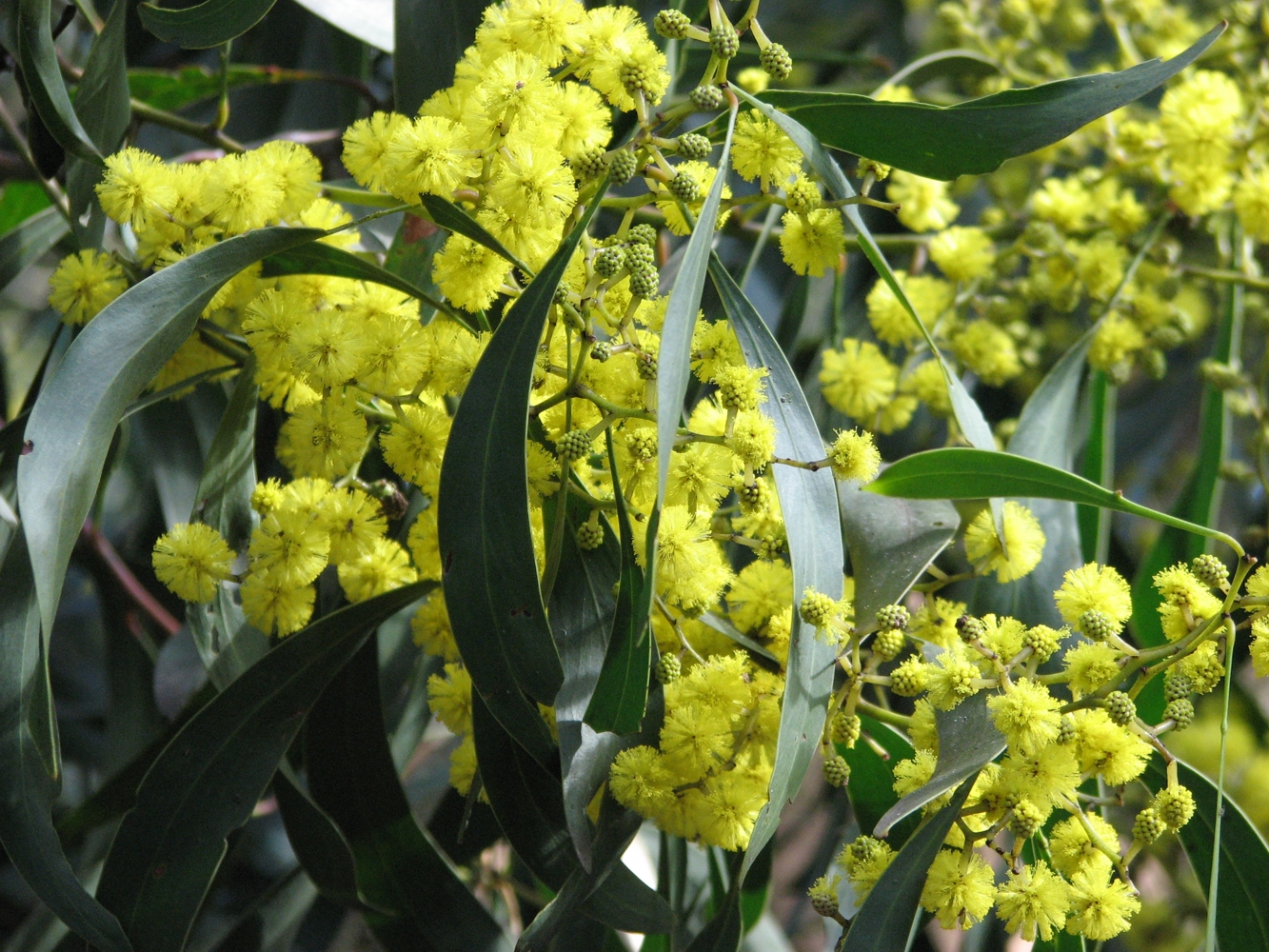
Golden wattle (Acacia pycnantha), the floral emblem of Australia

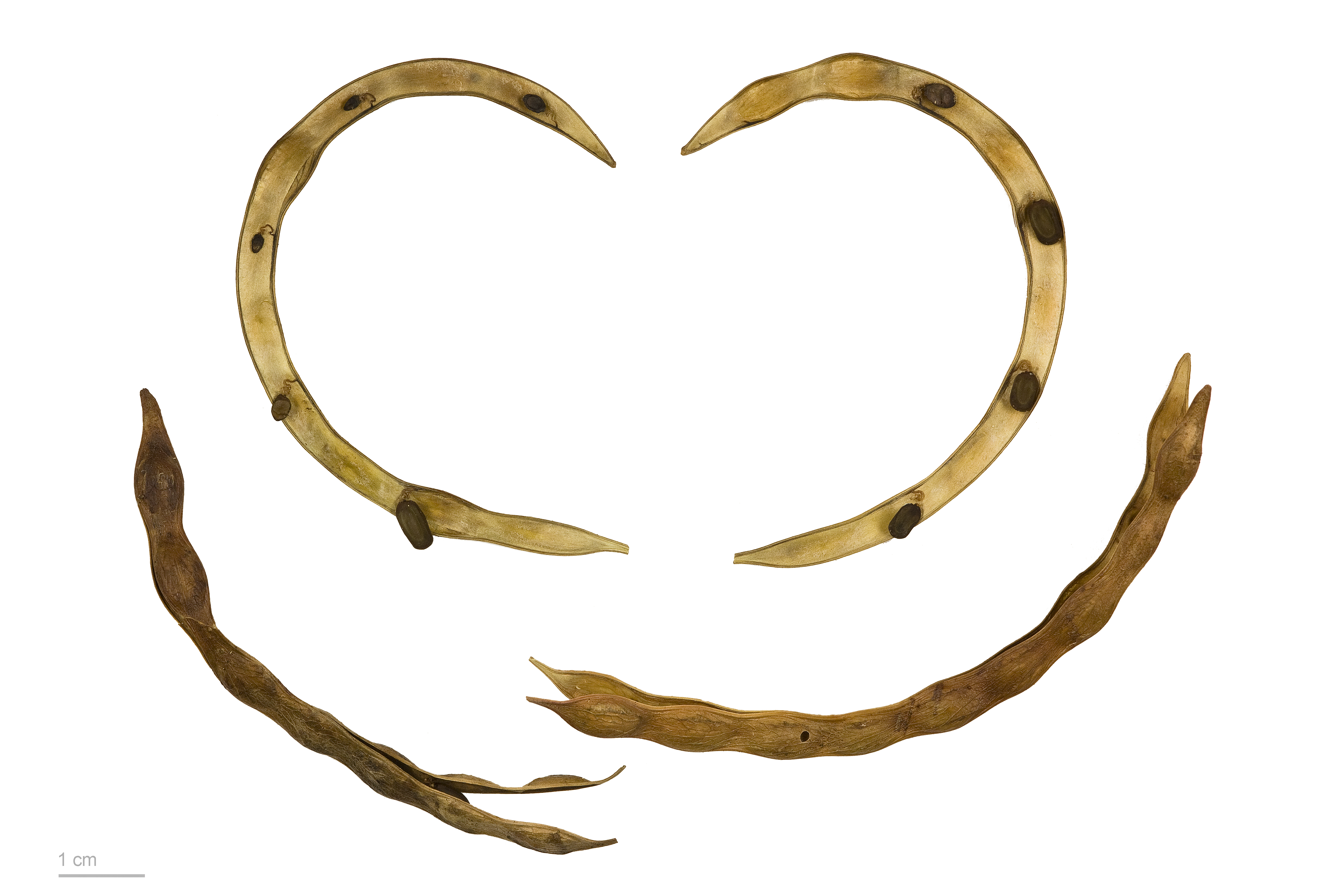
Seed pods of Acacia species from the MHNT

== Classification ==
English botanist and gardener Philip Miller adopted the name Acacia in 1754. The generic name is derived from ἀκακία (akakia), the name given by early Greek botanist-physician Pedanius Dioscorides (middle to late first century) to the medicinal tree A. nilotica in his book Materia Medica. This name derives from the Ancient Greek word for its characteristic thorns, ἀκίς (akis; "thorn"). The species name nilotica was given by Linnaeus from this tree's best-known range along the Nile river. This became the type species of the genus.

The traditional circumscription of Acacia eventually contained approximately 1,300 species. However, evidence began to accumulate that the genus as described was not monophyletic. Queensland botanist Leslie Pedley proposed the subgenus Phyllodineae be renamed Racosperma and published the binomial names. This was taken up in New Zealand but generally not followed in Australia, where botanists declared more study was needed.

Eventually, consensus emerged that Acacia needed to be split as it was not monophyletic. This led to Australian botanists Bruce Maslin and Tony Orchard pushing for the retypification of the genus with an Australian species instead of the original African type species, an exception to traditional rules of priority that required ratification by the International Botanical Congress. That decision has been controversial, and debate continued, with some taxonomists (and many other biologists) deciding to continue to use the traditional Acacia sensu lato circumscription of the genus, in defiance of decisions by an International Botanical Congress. However, a second International Botanical Congress has now confirmed the decision to apply the name Acacia to the mostly Australian plants, which some had been calling Racosperma, and which had formed the overwhelming majority of Acacia sensu lato. Debate continues regarding the traditional acacias of Africa, possibly placed in Senegalia and Vachellia, and some of the American species, possibly placed in Acaciella and Mariosousa.

Acacias belong to the subfamily Mimosoideae, the major clades of which may have formed in response to drying trends and fire regimes that accompanied increased seasonality during the late Oligocene to early Miocene (~25 mya). Pedley (1978), following Vassal (1972), viewed Acacia as comprising three large subgenera, but subsequently (1986) raised the rank of these groups to genera Acacia, Senegalia (s.l.) and Racosperma, which was underpinned by later genetic studies.

In common parlance, the term "acacia" is occasionally applied to species of the genus Robinia, which also belongs in the pea family. Robinia pseudoacacia, an American species locally known as black locust, is sometimes called "false acacia" in cultivation in the United Kingdom and throughout Europe.

== Description ==
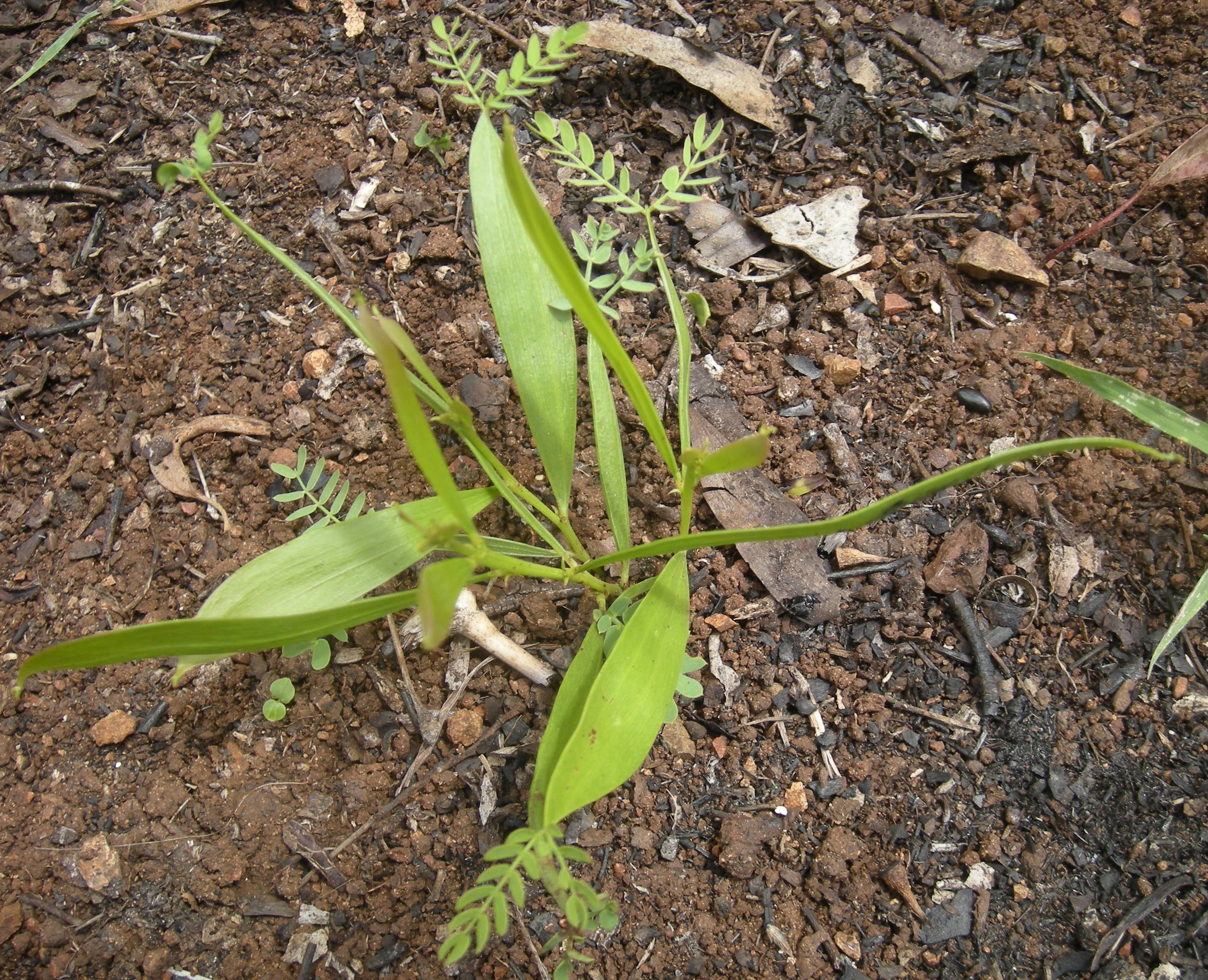
Acacia fasciculifera seedling in the transitional stage between pinnate leaves and phyllodes

The leaves of acacias are compound pinnate in general. In some species, however, more especially in the Australian and Pacific Islands species, the leaflets are suppressed, and the leaf-stalks (petioles) become vertically flattened in order to serve the purpose of leaves. These are known as "phyllodes". The vertical orientation of the phyllodes protects them from intense sunlight since with their edges towards the sky and earth they do not intercept light as fully as horizontally placed leaves. A few species (such as Acacia glaucoptera) lack leaves or phyllodes altogether but instead possess cladodes, modified leaf-like photosynthetic stems functioning as leaves.

The small flowers have five very small petals, almost hidden by the long stamens, and are arranged in dense, globular or cylindrical clusters; they are yellow or cream-colored in most species, whitish in some, or even purple (Acacia purpureopetala) or red (Acacia leprosa 'Scarlet Blaze'). Acacia flowers can be distinguished from those of a large related genus, Albizia, by their stamens, which are not joined at the base. Also, unlike individual Mimosa flowers, those of Acacia have more than ten stamens.

The plants often bear spines, especially those species growing in arid regions. These sometimes represent branches that have become short, hard, and pungent, though they sometimes represent leaf-stipules. Acacia armata is the kangaroo-thorn of Australia, and Acacia erioloba (syn. Acacia eriolobata) is the camelthorn of Africa.

Acacia seeds can be difficult to germinate. Research has found that immersing the seeds in various temperatures (usually around 80 °C (176 °F)) and manual seed coat chipping can improve growth to around 80%.

== Symbiosis ==
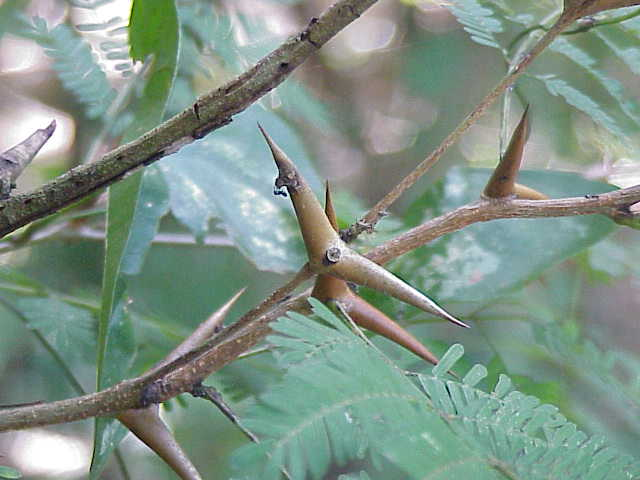
Acacia collinsii stipules

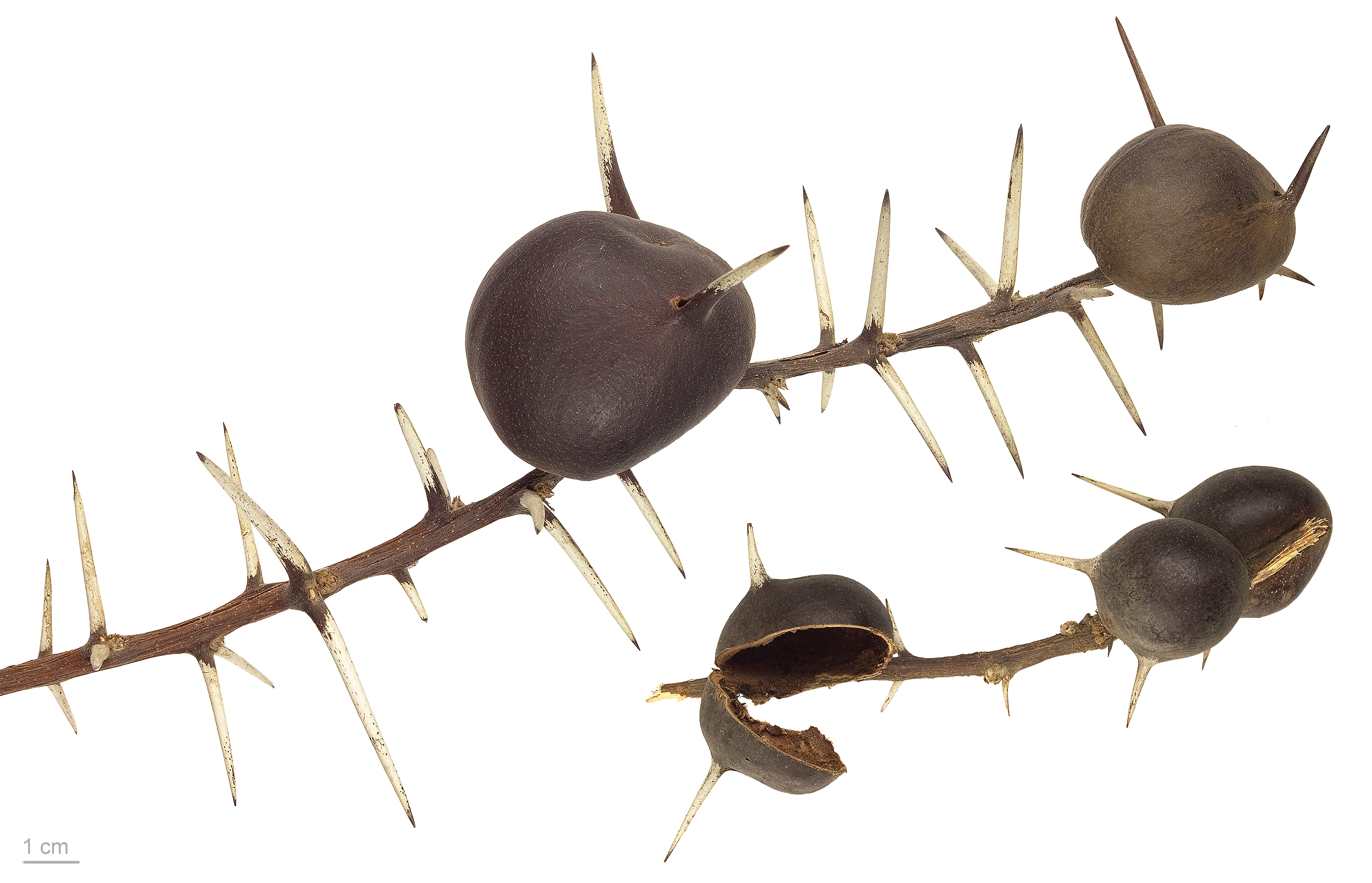
Swollen stipules of Acacia drepanolobium that serve as ant domatia. An entry hole can be seen at the base of one of the spines of the largest domatia. From the MHNT

In the Central American bullthorn acacias—Acacia sphaerocephala, Acacia cornigera and Acacia collinsii — some of the spiny stipules are large, swollen and hollow. These afford shelter for several species of Pseudomyrmex ants, which feed on extrafloral nectaries on the leaf-stalk and small lipid-rich food-bodies at the tips of the leaflets called Beltian bodies. In return, the ants add protection to the plant against herbivores. Some species of ants will also remove competing plants around the acacia, cutting off the offending plants' leaves with their jaws and ultimately killing them. Other associated ant species appear to do nothing to benefit their hosts.

Similar mutualisms with ants occur on Acacia trees in Africa, such as the whistling thorn acacia. The acacias provide shelter for ants in similar swollen stipules and nectar in extrafloral nectaries for their symbiotic ants, such as Crematogaster mimosae. In turn, the ants protect the plant by attacking large mammalian herbivores and stem-boring beetles that damage the plant.

The predominantly herbivorous spider Bagheera kiplingi, which is found in Central America and Mexico, feeds on nubs at the tips of the acacia leaves, known as Beltian bodies, which contain high concentrations of protein. These nubs are produced by the acacia as part of a symbiotic relationship with certain species of ant, which also eat them.

== Pests ==
In Australia, Acacia species are sometimes used as food plants by the larvae of hepialid moths of the genus Aenetus including A. ligniveren. These burrow horizontally into the trunk then vertically down. Other Lepidoptera larvae which have been recorded feeding on Acacia include brown-tail, Endoclita malabaricus and turnip moth. The leaf-mining larvae of some bucculatricid moths also feed on Acacia; Bucculatrix agilis feeds exclusively on Acacia horrida and Bucculatrix flexuosa feeds exclusively on Acacia nilotica.

Acacias contain a number of organic compounds that defend them from pests and grazing animals.

== Uses ==
=== Use as human food ===
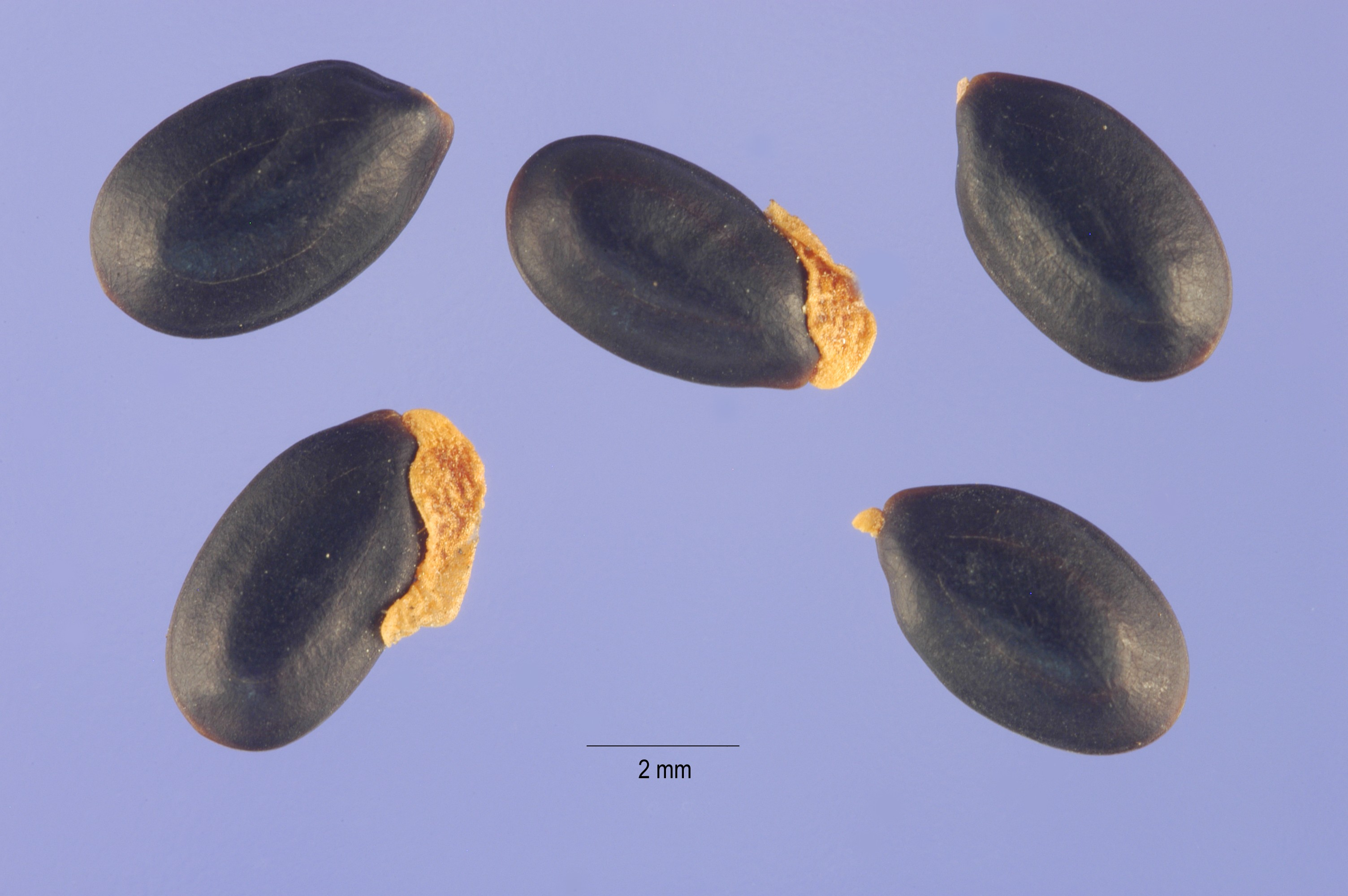
Acacia dealbata seeds

Acacia seeds are often used for food and a variety of other products.

In Myanmar, Laos, and Thailand, the feathery shoots of Acacia pennata (common name cha-om, ชะอม and su pout ywet in Burmese) are used in soups, curries, omelettes, and stir-fries.

=== Gum ===
Various species of acacia yield gum. True gum arabic is the product of Acacia senegal, abundant in dry tropical West Africa from Senegal to northern Nigeria.

Acacia nilotica (syn. Acacia arabica) is the gum arabic tree of India, but yields a gum inferior to the true gum arabic. Gum arabic is used in a wide variety of food products, including some soft drinks and confections.

The ancient Egyptians used acacia gum in paints.

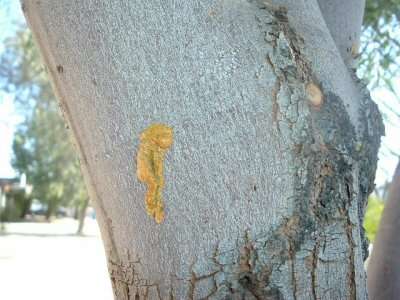
Sap, from which gum can be made, oozing from an Acacia tree in Phoenix, Arizona

The gum of Acacia xanthophloea and Acacia karroo has a high sugar content and is sought out by the lesser bushbaby. Acacia karroo gum was once used for making confectionery and traded under the name "Cape Gum". It was also used medicinally to treat cattle suffering poisoning by Moraea species.

=== Uses in folk medicine ===
Acacia species have possible uses in folk medicine. A 19th-century Ethiopian medical text describes a potion made from an Ethiopian species (known as grar) mixed with the root of the tacha, then boiled, as a cure for rabies.

An astringent medicine high in tannins, called catechu or cutch, is procured from several species, but more especially from Senegalia catechu (syn. Acacia catechu), by boiling down the wood and evaporating the solution so as to get an extract. The catechu extract from A. catechu figures in the history of chemistry in giving its name to the catechin, catechol, and catecholamine chemical families ultimately derived from it.

=== Ornamental uses ===
A few species are widely grown as ornamentals in gardens; the most popular perhaps is A. dealbata (silver wattle), with its attractive glaucous to silvery leaves and bright yellow flowers; it is erroneously known as "mimosa" in some areas where it is cultivated, through confusion with the related genus Mimosa.

Another ornamental acacia is the fever tree. Southern European florists use A. baileyana, A. dealbata, A. pycnantha and A. retinodes as cut flowers and the common name there for them is mimosa.

Ornamental species of acacias are also used by homeowners and landscape architects for home security. The sharp thorns of some species are a deterrent to trespassing, and may prevent break-ins if planted under windows and near drainpipes. The aesthetic characteristics of acacia plants, in conjunction with their home security qualities, makes them a reasonable alternative to constructed fences and walls.

=== Perfume ===
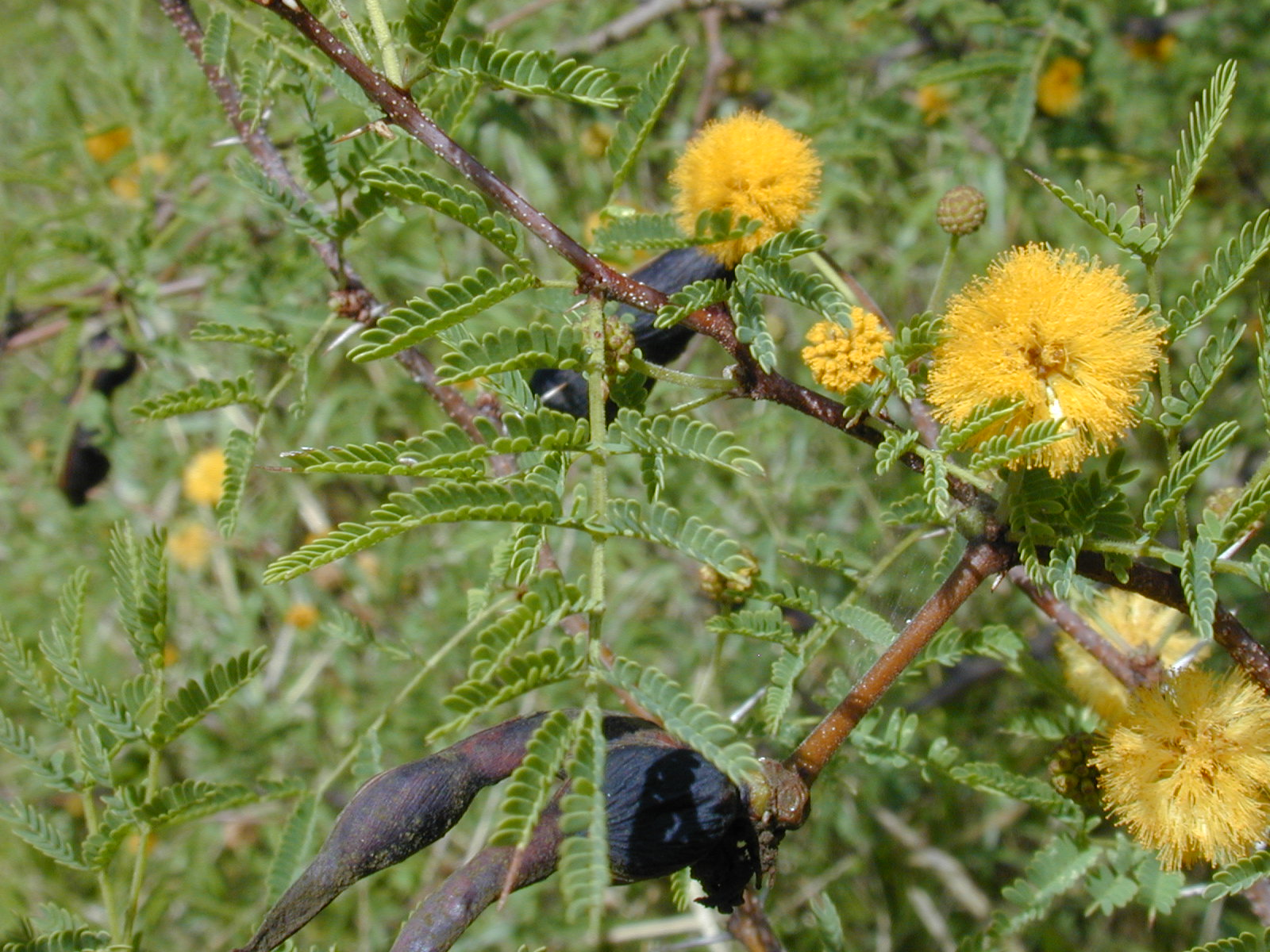
Acacia farnesiana

Acacia farnesiana is used in the perfume industry due to its strong fragrance. The use of acacia as a fragrance dates back centuries.

=== Symbolism and ritual ===
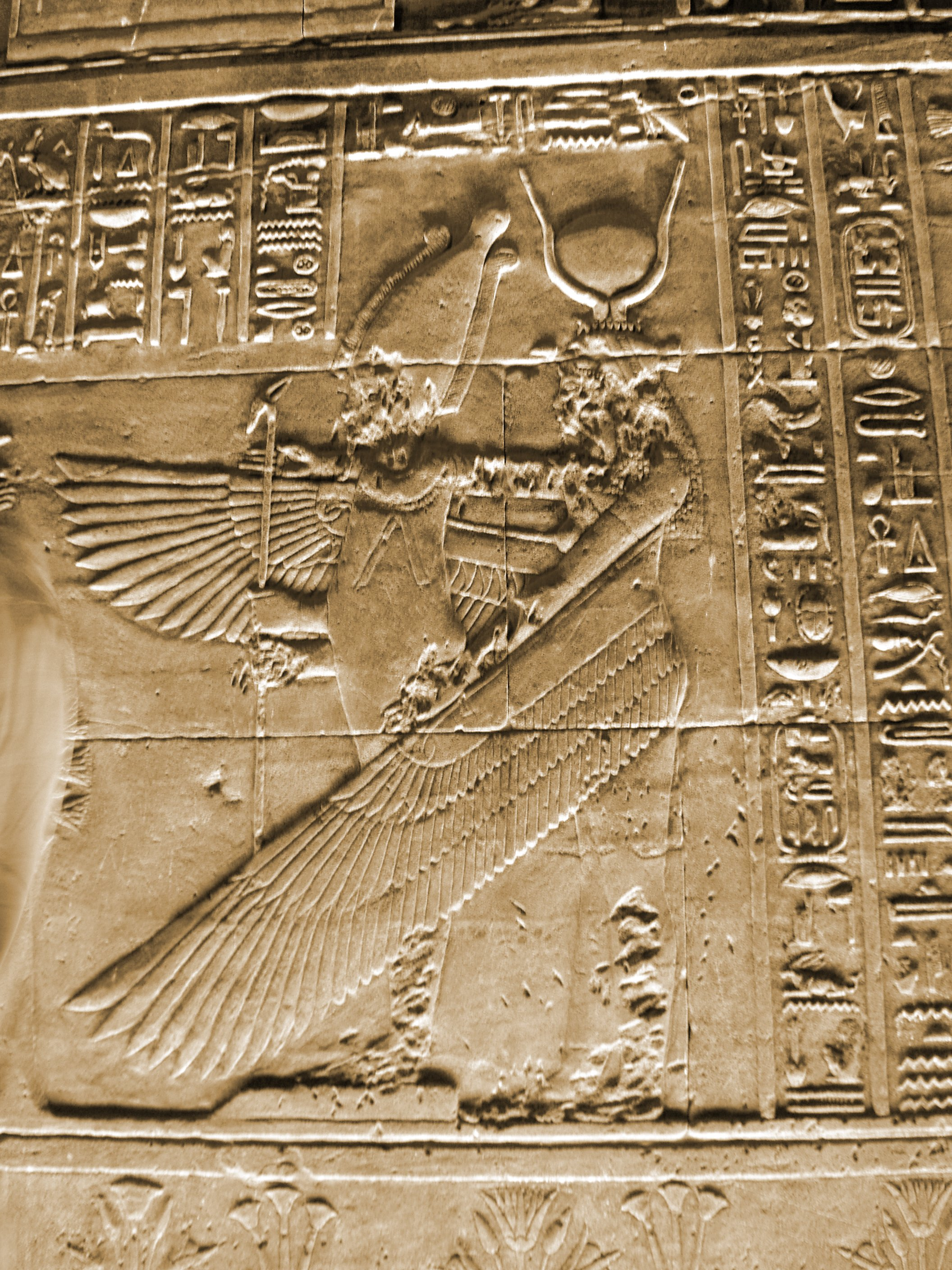
Egyptian goddess Isis

Egyptian mythology has associated the acacia tree with characteristics of the tree of life, such as in the Myth of Osiris and Isis.

Several parts (mainly bark, root, and resin) of Acacia species are used to make incense for rituals. Acacia is used in incense mainly in India, Nepal, and China including in its Tibet region. Smoke from acacia bark is thought to keep demons and ghosts away and to put the gods in a good mood. Roots and resin from acacia are combined with rhododendron, acorus, cytisus, salvia, and some other components of incense. Both people and elephants like an alcoholic beverage made from acacia fruit. According to Easton's Bible Dictionary, the acacia tree may be the "burning bush" (Exodus 3:2) which Moses encountered in the desert. Also, when God gave Moses the instructions for building the Tabernacle, he said to "make an ark" and "a table of acacia wood" (Exodus 25:10 & 23, Revised Standard Version). Also, in the Christian tradition, Christ's crown of thorns is thought to have been woven from acacia.

Acacia was used for Zulu warriors' iziQu (or isiKu) beads, which passed on through Robert Baden-Powell to the Scout movement's Wood Badge training award.

In Russia, Italy, and other countries, it is customary to present women with yellow mimosas (among other flowers) on International Women's Day (March 8). These "mimosas" may be from A. dealbata (silver wattle).

In 1918, May Gibbs, the popular Australian children's author, wrote the book 'Wattle Babies', in which a third-person narrator describes the lives of imaginary inhabitants of the Australian forests (the 'bush'). The main characters are the Wattle Babies, who are tiny people that look like acacia flowers and who interact with various forest creatures. Gibbs wrote "Wattle Babies are the sunshine of the Bush. In Winter, when the sky is grey and all the world seems cold, they put on their yellowest clothes and come out, for they have such cheerful hearts." Gibbs was referring to the fact that an abundance of acacias flower in August in Australia, in the midst of the southern hemisphere winter.

=== Tannin ===
The bark of various Australian species, known as wattles, is very rich in tannin and forms an important article of export; important species include A. pycnantha (golden wattle), A. decurrens (tan wattle), A. dealbata (silver wattle) and A. mearnsii (black wattle).

Black wattle is grown in plantations in South Africa and South America. The pods of A. nilotica (under the name of neb-neb), and of other African species, are also rich in tannin and used by tanners. In Yemen, the principal tannin substance was derived from the leaves of the salam-tree (Acacia etbaica), a tree known locally by the name qaraẓ (garadh). A bath solution of the crushed leaves of this tree, into which raw leather had been inserted for prolonged soaking, would take only 15 days for curing. The water and leaves, however, required changing after seven or eight days, and the leather needed to be turned over daily.

=== Wood ===
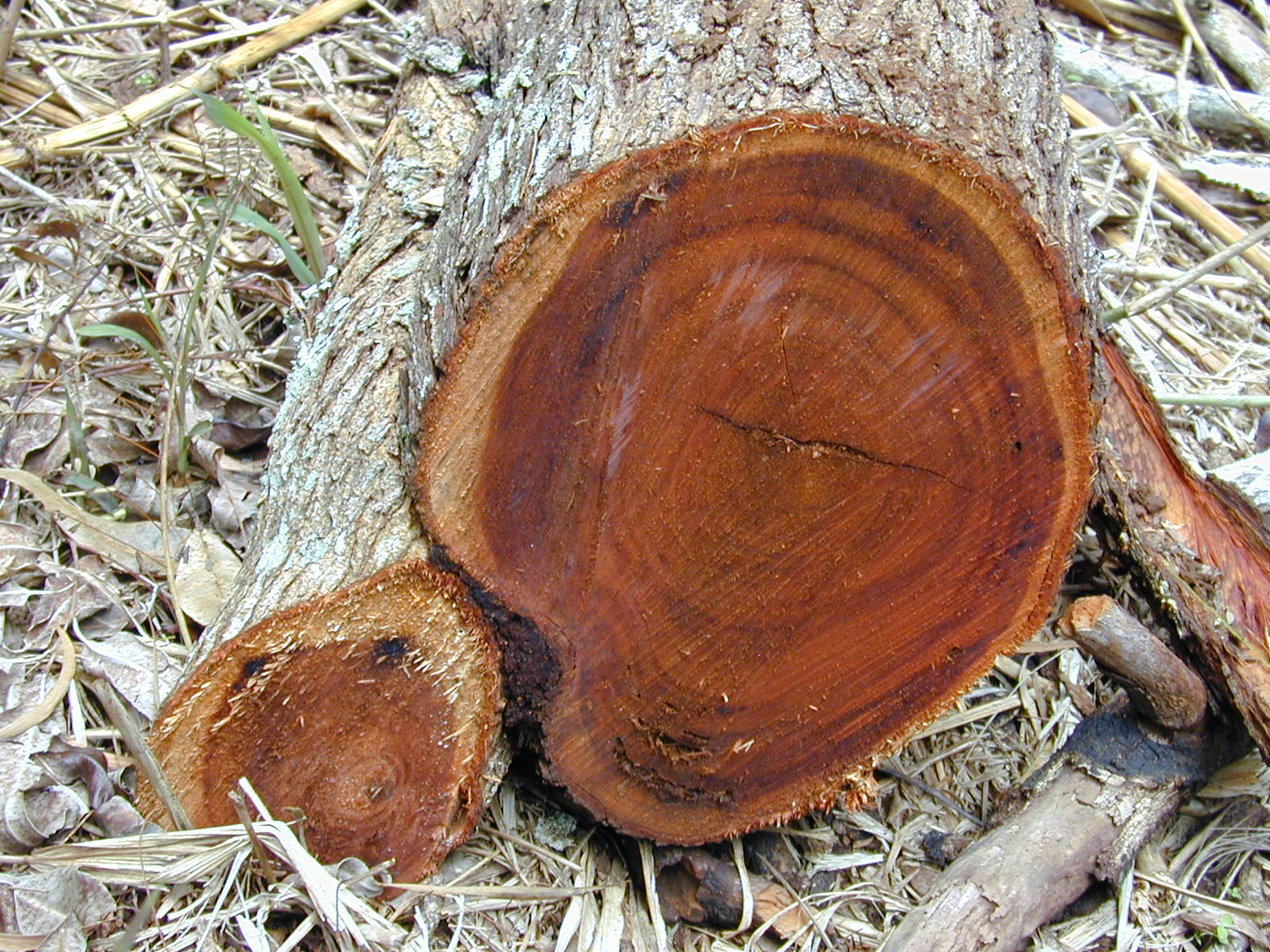
Acacia koa wood

Some Acacia species are valuable as timber, such as A. melanoxylon (blackwood) from Australia, which attains a great size; its wood is used for furniture, and takes a high polish; and A. omalophylla (myall wood, also Australian), which yields a fragrant timber used for ornaments. A. seyal is thought to be the shittah-tree of the Bible, which supplied shittim-wood. According to the Book of Exodus, this was used in the construction of the Ark of the Covenant. A. koa from the Hawaiian Islands and A. heterophylla from Réunion are both excellent timber trees. Depending on abundance and regional culture, some Acacia species (e.g. A. fumosa) are traditionally used locally as firewoods. It is also used to make homes for different animals.

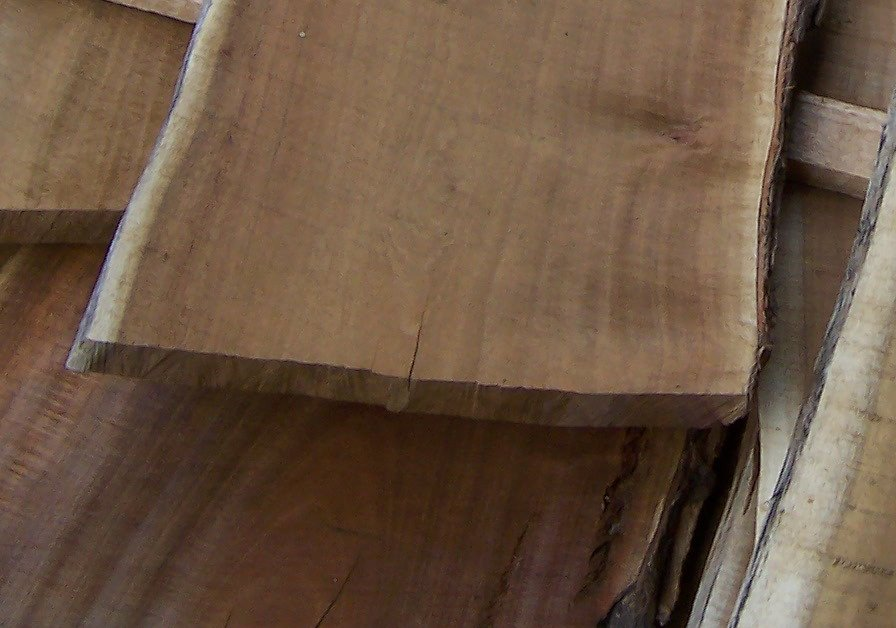
A. heterophylla wood

=== Pulpwood ===
In Indonesia (mainly in Sumatra) and in Malaysia (mainly in Sabah), plantations of A. mangium are being established to supply pulpwood to the paper industry.

Acacia wood pulp gives high opacity and below average bulk paper. This is suitable in lightweight offset papers used for Bibles and dictionaries. It is also used in paper tissue where it improves softness.

=== Land reclamation ===
Acacias can be planted for erosion control, especially after mining or construction damage.

== Ecological invasion ==
For the same reasons it is favored as an erosion-control plant, with its easy spreading and resilience, some varieties of acacia are potentially invasive species. At least fourteen Acacia species introduced to South Africa are categorized as invasive, due to their naturally aggressive propagation. One of the most globally significant invasive acacias is black wattle A. mearnsii, which is taking over grasslands and abandoned agricultural areas worldwide, especially in moderate coastal and island regions where mild climate promotes its spread. Australian/New Zealand Weed Risk Assessment gives it a "high risk, score of 15" rating and it is considered one of the world's 100 most invasive species. Extensive ecological studies should be performed before further introduction of acacia varieties, as this fast-growing genus, once introduced, spreads quickly and is extremely difficult to eradicate.

== Phytochemistry ==
=== Cyanogenic glycosides ===
Nineteen different species of Acacia in the Americas contain cyanogenic glycosides, which, if exposed to an enzyme which specifically splits glycosides, can release hydrogen cyanide (HCN) in the "leaves". This sometimes results in the poisoning death of livestock.

If fresh plant material spontaneously produces 200 ppm or more HCN, then it is potentially toxic. This corresponds to about 7.5 μmol HCN per gram of fresh plant material. It turns out that, if acacia "leaves" lack the specific glycoside-splitting enzyme, then they may be less toxic than otherwise, even those containing significant quantities of cyanic glycosides.

Some Acacia species containing cyanogens include Acacia erioloba, A. cunninghamii, A. obtusifolia, A. sieberiana, and A. sieberiana var. woodii

== Famous acacias ==
The Arbre du Ténéré in Niger was the most isolated tree in the world, about 400 km (249 mi) from any other tree. The tree was knocked down and killed by a truck driver in 1973.

In Nairobi, Kenya, the Thorn Tree Café is named after a Naivasha thorn tree (Acacia xanthophloea) in its centre. Travelers used to pin notes to others to the thorns of the tree. The current tree is the third of the same variety.
