= Acacia giraffae =

Acacia giraffae can refer to:

- Acacia giraffae Hochst. ex A.Rich., a synonym of Vachellia seyal var. seyal (Delile) P.J.H.Hurter
- Acacia giraffae Willd., a synonym of Vachellia erioloba (E.Mey.) P.J.H.Hurter
