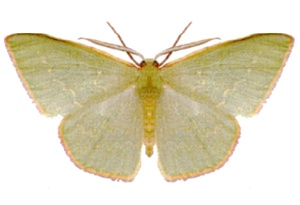

Scientific classification
- Kingdom: Animalia
- Phylum: Arthropoda
- Clade: Pancrustacea
- Class: Insecta
- Order: Lepidoptera
- Family: Geometridae
- Genus: Chlorocoma
- Species: C. dichloraria

Binomial name
- Chlorocoma dichloraria (Guenée, 1857/1858)

Synonyms
- Chlorochroma dichloraria Guenée, [1858]

= Chlorocoma dichloraria =

Species of moth

Chlorocoma dichloraria, the double-fringed emerald or Guenée's emerald, is a species of moth of the family Geometridae. It was first described by Achille Guenée in 1858. It is found in the Australian states of Queensland, New South Wales, Victoria, Tasmania, South Australia, and Western Australia, as well as in the Australian Capital Territory.

The wingspan is about 30 mm. The larvae feed on various wattle (Mimosaceae) species, including Acacia mearnsii.
