= White ball =

White ball may refer to:

- White ball cricket, played with limited overs
- Cue ball, in billiards, usually white
- White Ball, Somerset, a hamlet in Sampford Arundel parish, England
- White Ball, referring to the 4th song in Hawaii Part : II by Miracle Musical.

== See also ==
- White ball acacia, Acaciella angustissima
