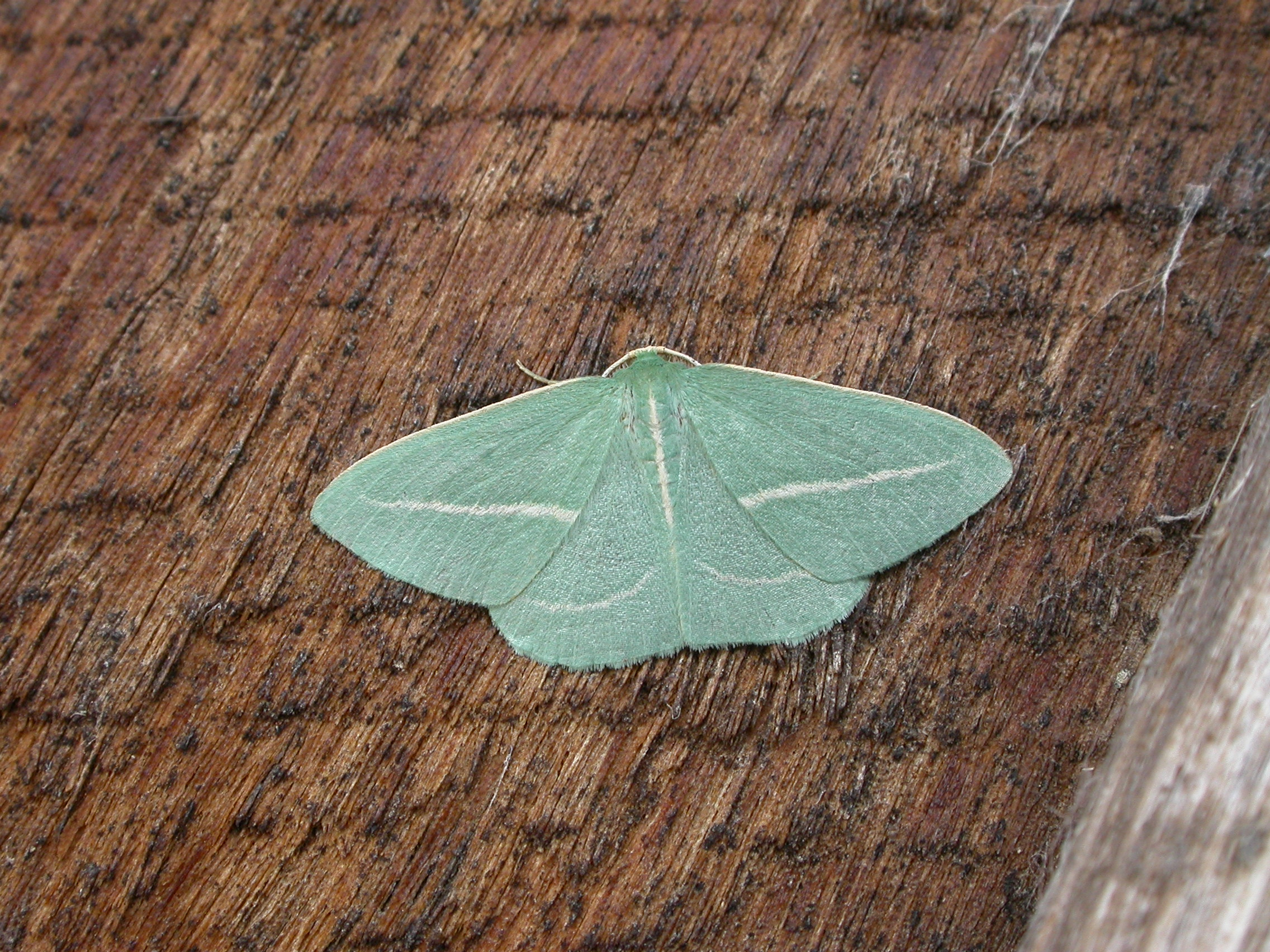

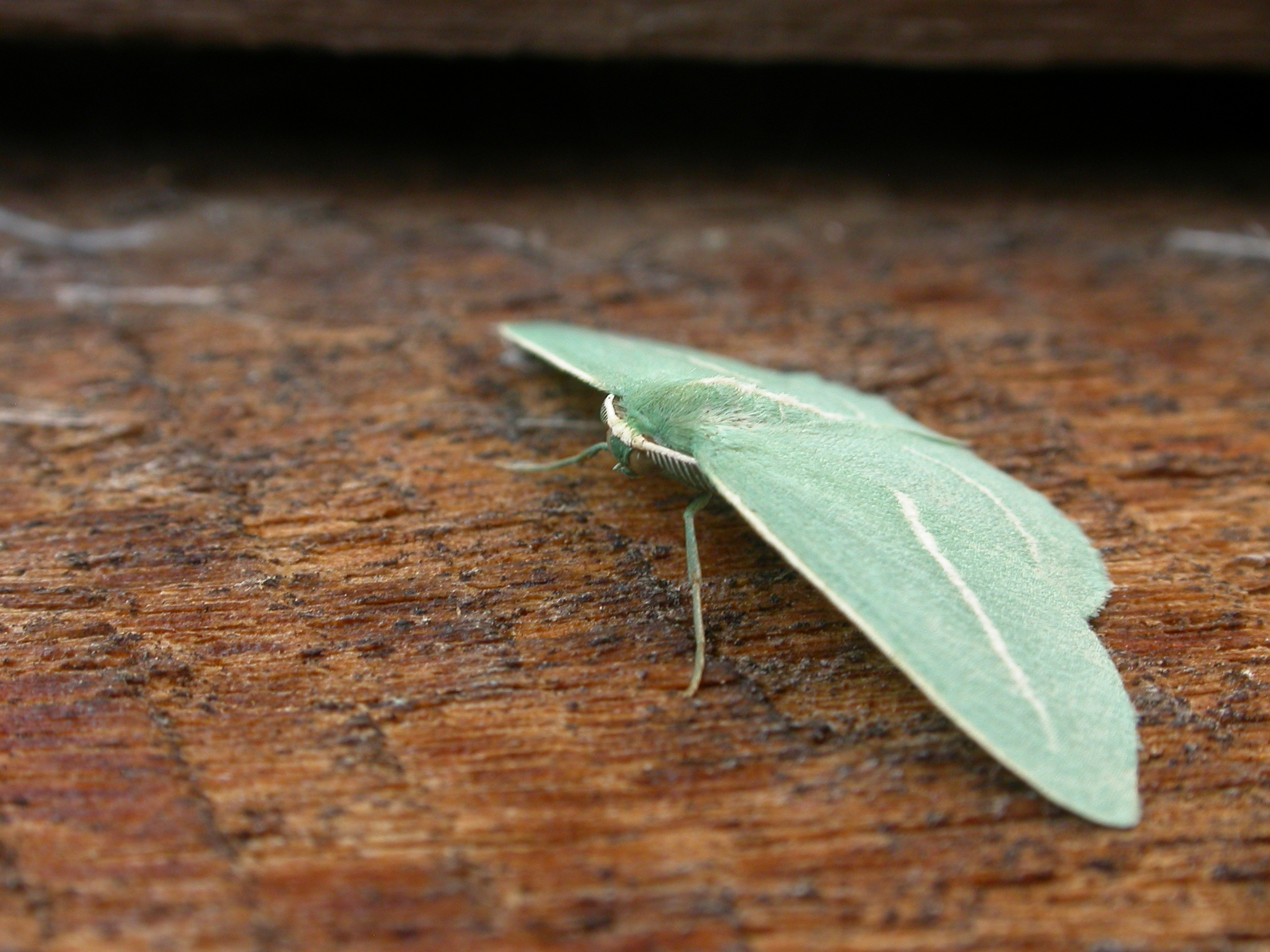

Scientific classification
- Kingdom: Animalia
- Phylum: Arthropoda
- Clade: Pancrustacea
- Class: Insecta
- Order: Lepidoptera
- Family: Geometridae
- Genus: Chlorocoma
- Species: C. stereota

Binomial name
- Chlorocoma stereota (Meyrick, 1888)

Synonyms
- Iodis stereota Meyrick, 1888

= Chlorocoma stereota =

Species of moth

Chlorocoma stereota, the white-lined emerald, is a moth of the family Geometridae. It was first described by Edward Meyrick in 1888. It is known from Australia, including Victoria, Queensland, New South Wales, and South Australia.

The wingspan is about 30 mm. The larvae presumably feed on bipinnate wattles.
