= Acaciella angustissima var. suffrutescens =

Conservation status
- Apparently Secure (NatureServe)

Scientific classification
- Kingdom: Plantae
- Clade: Tracheophytes
- Clade: Angiosperms
- Clade: Eudicots
- Clade: Rosids
- Order: Fabales
- Family: Fabaceae
- Subfamily: Caesalpinioideae
- Clade: Mimosoid clade
- Genus: Acaciella
- Species: A. angustissima
- Variety: A. a. var. suffrutescens

Trinomial name
- Acaciella angustissima var. suffrutescens (Rose) Isely

Synonyms
- Acacia angustissima subsp. suffrutescens (Rose) Wiggins; Acacia angustissima var. suffrutescens (Rose) Isely; Acacia hirta var. suffrutescens (Rose) Kearney & Peebles; Acacia suffrutescens Rose; Acaciella suffrutescens (Rose) Britton & Rose

Variety of legume

Acaciella angustissima var. suffrutescens is a perennial shrub native to Arizona, United States. Acaciella angustissima var. suffrutescens range map in the U.S.
