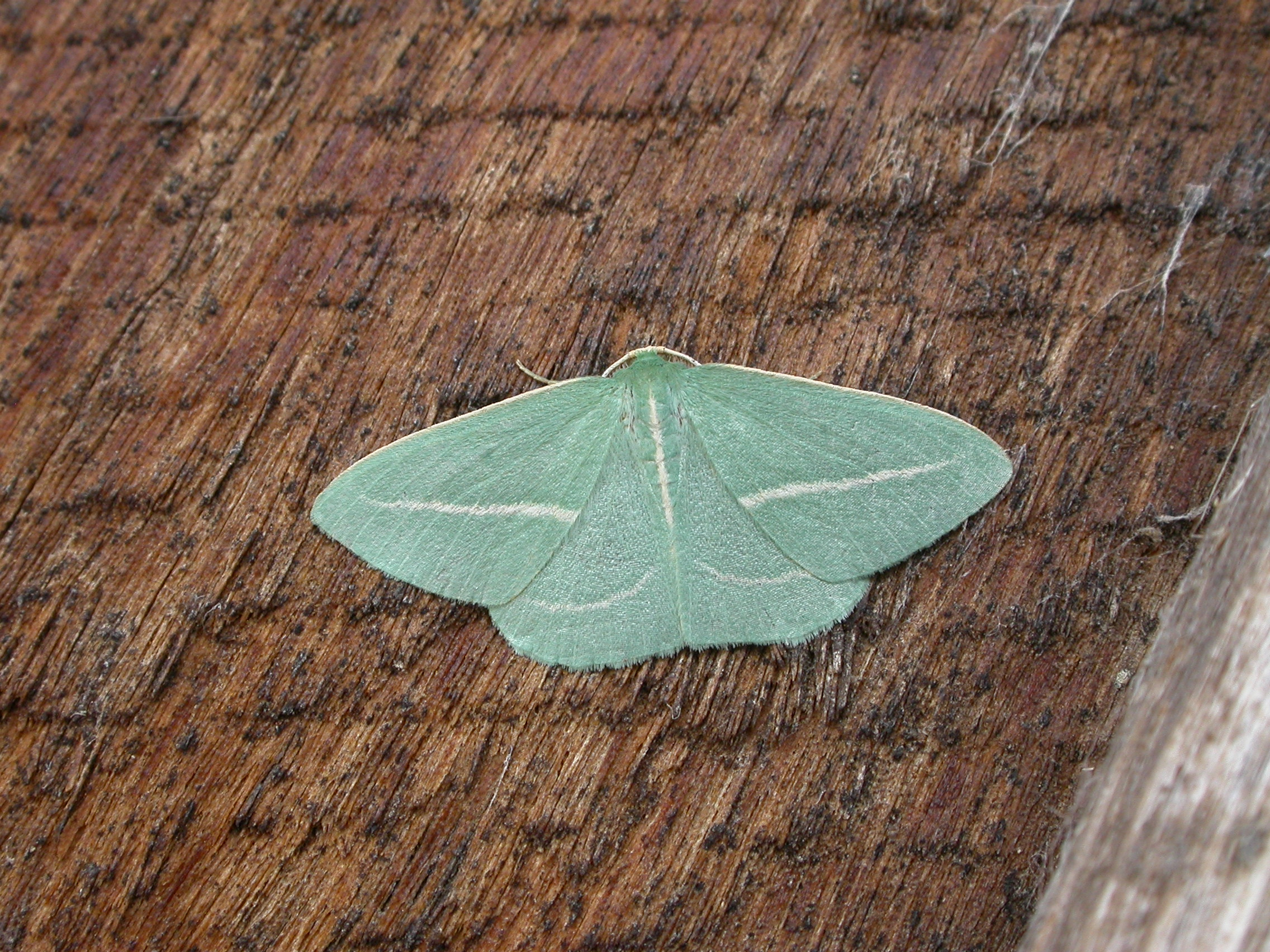
- Chlorocoma stereota

Scientific classification
- Kingdom: Animalia
- Phylum: Arthropoda
- Clade: Pancrustacea
- Class: Insecta
- Order: Lepidoptera
- Family: Geometridae
- Subfamily: Geometrinae
- Genus: Chlorocoma; Turner, 1910

= Chlorocoma =

Genus of moths

Chlorocoma is a genus of moths in the family Geometridae.

== Species ==
There are 27 accepted species:

- Chlorocoma asemanta (Meyrick, 1888)
- Chlorocoma assimilis (Lucas, 1888)
- Chlorocoma cadmaria (Guenée, [1858])
- Chlorocoma carenaria (Guenée, [1858])
- Chlorocoma clopia Prout, 1922
- Chlorocoma cyclosema Turner, 1941
- Chlorocoma dichloraria (Guenée, [1858])
- Chlorocoma didita (Walker, 1861)
- Chlorocoma dilatata (Walker, 1861)
- Chlorocoma eucela Prout, 1922
- Chlorocoma externa (Walker, 1861)
- Chlorocoma halochlora (Meyrick, 1888)
- Chlorocoma ipomopsis (Lower, 1892)
- Chlorocoma melocrossa (Meyrick, 1888)
- Chlorocoma monocyma (Meyrick, 1888)
- Chlorocoma neptunus (Butler, 1886)
- Chlorocoma octoplagiata Holloway, 1979
- Chlorocoma paraphylla (Lower, 1902)
- Chlorocoma pediobates Turner, 1939
- Chlorocoma periphracta (Turner, 1904)
- Chlorocoma rhodocrossa (Turner, 1906)
- Chlorocoma rhodoloma Turner, 1910
- Chlorocoma rhodothrix Turner, 1922
- Chlorocoma stereota (Meyrick, 1888)
- Chlorocoma tachypora Turner, 1910
- Chlorocoma tetraspila (Lower, 1901)
- Chlorocoma vertumnaria (Guenée, [1858])
