= Shittim =

Shittim may mean several different things:

Botany

- Shittim, the plural of Shittah, which is Hebrew for wood from the acacia tree, which appears in the Bible

Places

- Abel-Shittim, Ha-Shittim, or simply Shittim, later Abila (Peraea), a place that appears in the Bible
- Shitim, a village in southern Israel
