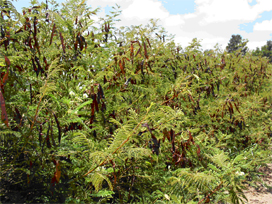
- Acaciella angustissima

Scientific classification
- Kingdom: Plantae
- Clade: Tracheophytes
- Clade: Angiosperms
- Clade: Eudicots
- Clade: Rosids
- Order: Fabales
- Family: Fabaceae
- Subfamily: Caesalpinioideae
- Clade: Mimosoid clade
- Genus: Acaciella; Britton & Rose

Type species
- Acaciella villosa (Sw.) Britton & Rose

Species
- 15; see text.
- The range of the genus Acaciella.

Synonyms
- Acacia subg. Aculeiferum sect. Filicinae Benth.; Acacia subg. Aculeiferum sect. Filicinum ser. Filicinae Taub.; Senegalia sect. Filicinae (Benth.) Pedley

= Acaciella =

Genus of legumes

Acaciella is a Neotropical genus of flowering plants in the legume family, Fabaceae, and its subfamily Mimosoideae. Its centre of diversity is along the Mexican Pacific coast. They are unarmed, have no extrafloral nectaries and the polyads of their pollen are 8-celled. Though its numerous free stamens (sometimes >300) is typical of Acacia s.l., it has several characteristics in common with genus Piptadenia (tribe Mimoseae). Its pollen and free amino acids resemble that of Senegalia. Molecular studies place it sister to a monophyletic clade comprising elements of genus Acacia, and the tribe Ingeae. A nectary ring is present between the stamens and ovary, in common with Acacia subg. Aculeiferum.

== Species ==
- Acaciella angustissima (Mill.) Britton & Rose—Prairie acacia, Prairie wattle, Fern acacia
  - var. angustissima (Mill.) Britton & Rose
  - var. chisosiana —Chisos acacia, Chisos prairie acacia, Prairie acacia
  - var. filicoides (Cav.) L. Rico
  - var. hirta —Prairie acacia
  - var. shrevei —Shreve's Prairie acacia
  - var. suffrutescens —Prairie acacia
  - var. texensis (Nutt. ex Torrey & A. Gray) L. Rico—Prairie wattle, Whiteball acacia
- Acaciella barrancana (H. Gentry) L. Rico
- Acaciella bicolor Britton & Rose
- Acaciella chamelensis (L. Rico) L. Rico
- Acaciella glauca (L.) L. Rico—Yellow tamarind acacia, (Jamaica) Yellow tamarind
- Acaciella goldmanii Britton & Rose
- Acaciella hartwegii (Benth.) Britton & Rose
- Acaciella igualensis Britton & Rose
- Acaciella lemmonii (Rose) L. Rico
- Acaciella painteri Britton & Rose
  - var. houghii (Britton & Rose) L. Rico
  - var. painteri Britton & Rose
- Acaciella rosei (Standl.) L. Rico
- Acaciella sotoi L. Rico
- Acaciella sousae (L. Rico) L. Rico
- Acaciella tequilana (S. Wats.) Britton & Rose
  - var. crinita (Rose) L. Rico
  - var. pubifoliolata L. Rico
  - var. tequilana (S. Wats.) Britton & Rose
- Acaciella villosa (Sw.) Britton & Rose
