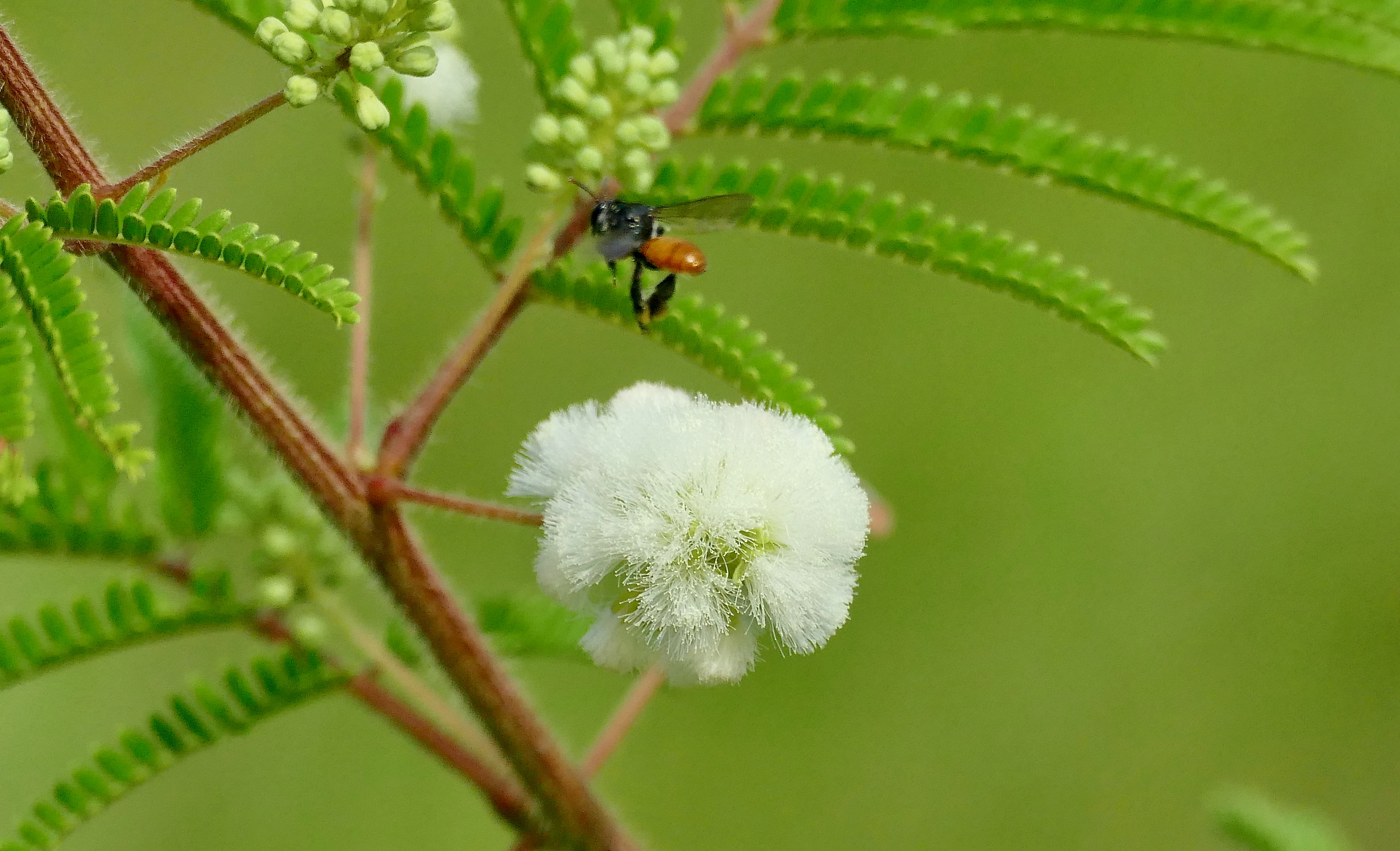
- Bee leaving flower

Conservation status
- Least Concern (IUCN 3.1)

Scientific classification
- Kingdom: Plantae
- Clade: Tracheophytes
- Clade: Angiosperms
- Clade: Eudicots
- Clade: Rosids
- Order: Fabales
- Family: Fabaceae
- Subfamily: Caesalpinioideae
- Clade: Mimosoid clade
- Genus: Acaciella
- Species: A. villosa

Binomial name
- Acaciella villosa (Sw.) Britton & Rose

Synonyms
- Acacia villosa (Sw.) Willd.

= Acaciella villosa =

Species of legume

Acaciella villosa, commonly known as casha tree, is a species of legume in the family Fabaceae. It is found only in Jamaica.
