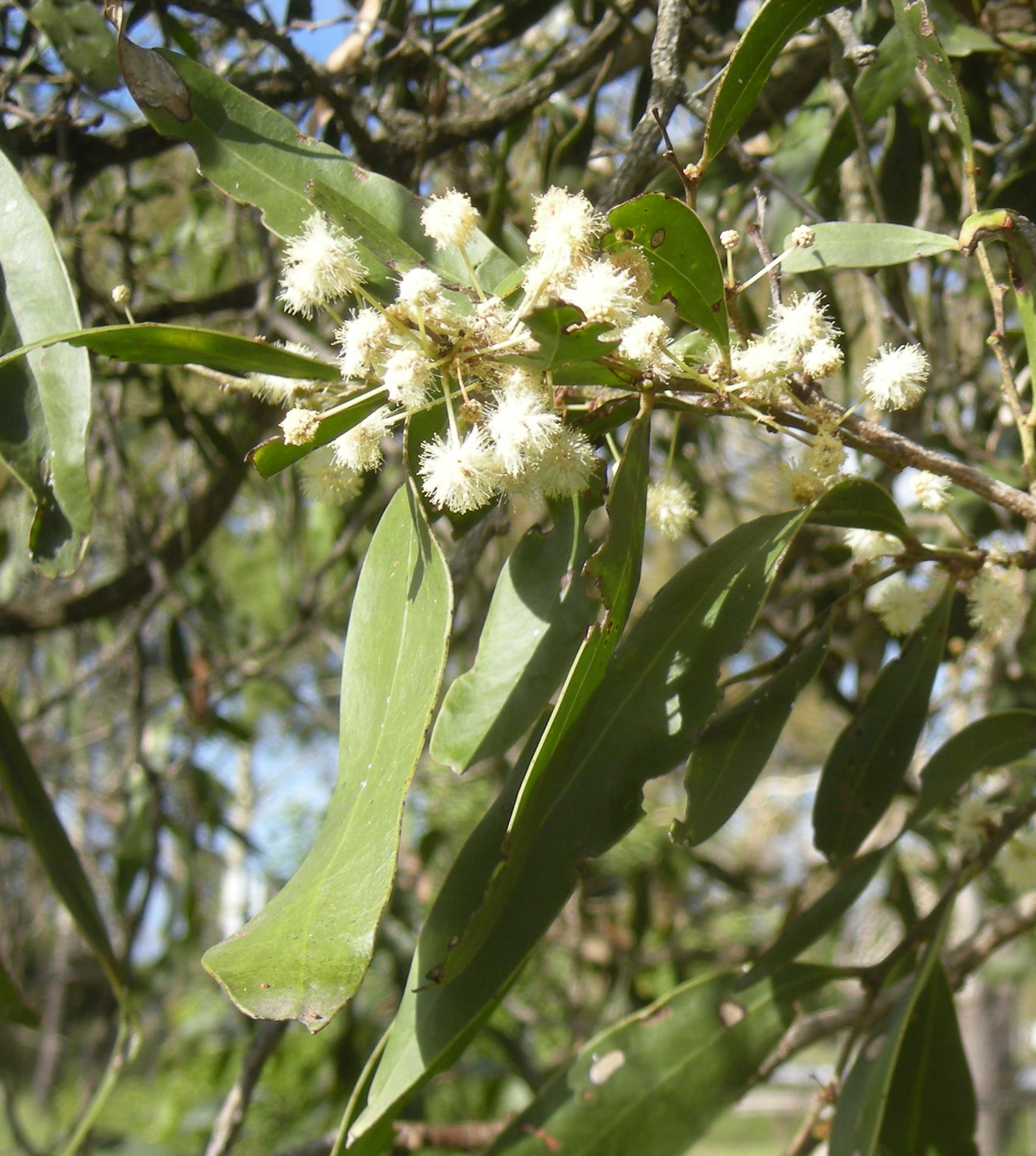

Scientific classification
- Kingdom: Plantae
- Clade: Tracheophytes
- Clade: Angiosperms
- Clade: Eudicots
- Clade: Rosids
- Order: Fabales
- Family: Fabaceae
- Subfamily: Caesalpinioideae
- Clade: Mimosoid clade
- Genus: Acacia
- Species: A. fasciculifera

Binomial name
- Acacia fasciculifera F.Muell. ex. Benth.
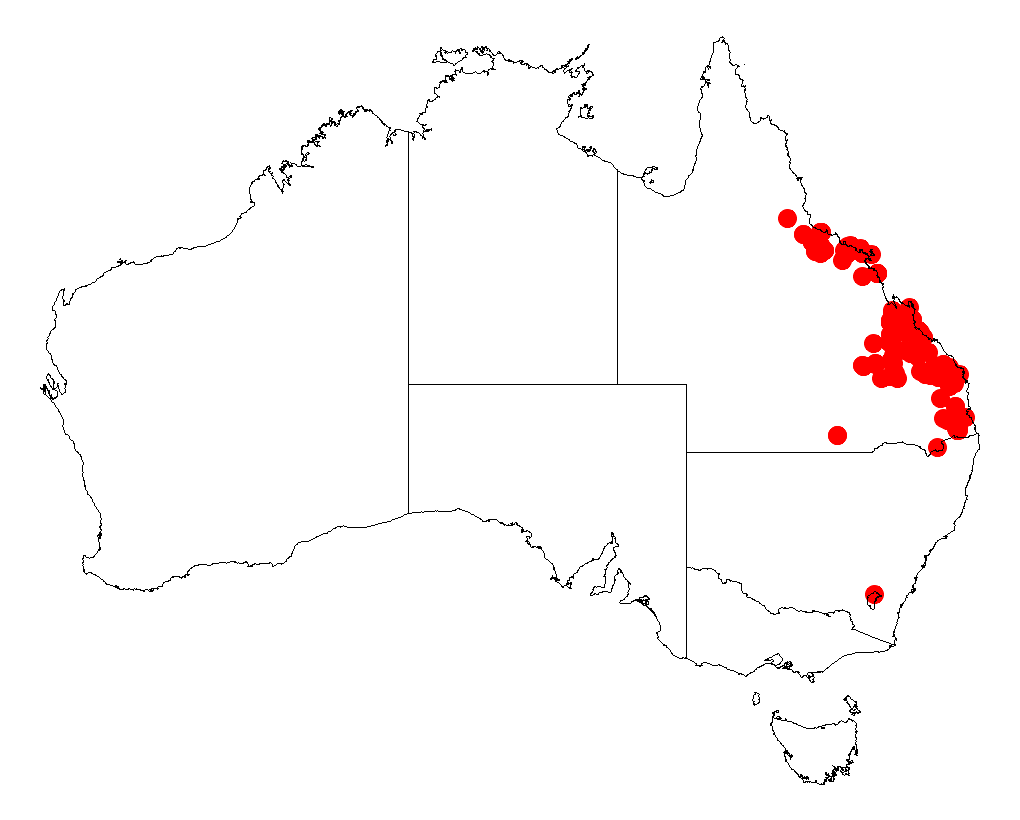
- Occurrence data from AVH

Synonyms
- Acacia penninervis var. stenophylla Domin; Racosperma fasciculiferum (Benth.) Pedley

= Acacia fasciculifera =

Scrub ironbark

Species of plant

Acacia fasciculifera, commonly known as scrub ironbark, rosewood, rose wattle, or scaly bark, is a species of flowering plant in the family Fabaceae and is endemic to Queensland, Australia. It is a tree with pendulous, glabrous branchlets, narrowly oblong to narrowly elliptic phyllodes, spherical heads of creamy-coloured flowers and linear, thinly leathery pods.

== Description ==
Acacia fasciculifera is a tree that usually grows to a height of up to about 10 m (33 ft) and forms a dense canopy. Its branchlets are pendulous and normally glabrous. The phyllodes are narrowly oblong to narrowly elliptic, 40–150 mm (1.6–5.9 in) long and 7–20 mm (0.28–0.79 in) wide, slightly leathery with a prominent midrib and marginal veins. The flowers are borne in two to eight spherical heads in racemes 1–3 mm (0.039–0.118 in) long, often appearing as clusters in axils, on a peduncle 10–29 mm (0.39–1.14 in) long. Each head has 20 to 40 cream-coloured flowers. Flowering usually occurs in summer, and the pods are thinly leathery, up to 125 mm (4.9 in) long and usually 10–13 mm (0.39–0.51 in) wide with a prominent marginal vein. The seeds are oblong to round and flat, usually 6–7 mm (0.24–0.28 in) long, slightly shiny dark brown, with a small aril.

== Taxonomy ==
Acacia fasciculifera was first formally described in 1864 by the botanist George Bentham from an unpublished description by Ferdinand von Mueller. Bentham's description was published in his Flora Australiensis from specimens collected by John Dallachy.

== Distribution and habitat ==
Scrub ironbark is mainly found from near Boonah in the south up to near Rockhampton with a few scattered populations further north to near Bowen. It is found on ridges and along creeks in Eucalyptus forest, or with Brigalow (Acacia harpophylla).

== Conservation status ==
Acacia fasciculifera is listed as of "least concern" under the Queensland Government Nature Conservation Act 1992.

== Uses ==
This species of wattle is sometimes logged for timber.

== See also ==
- List of Acacia species
