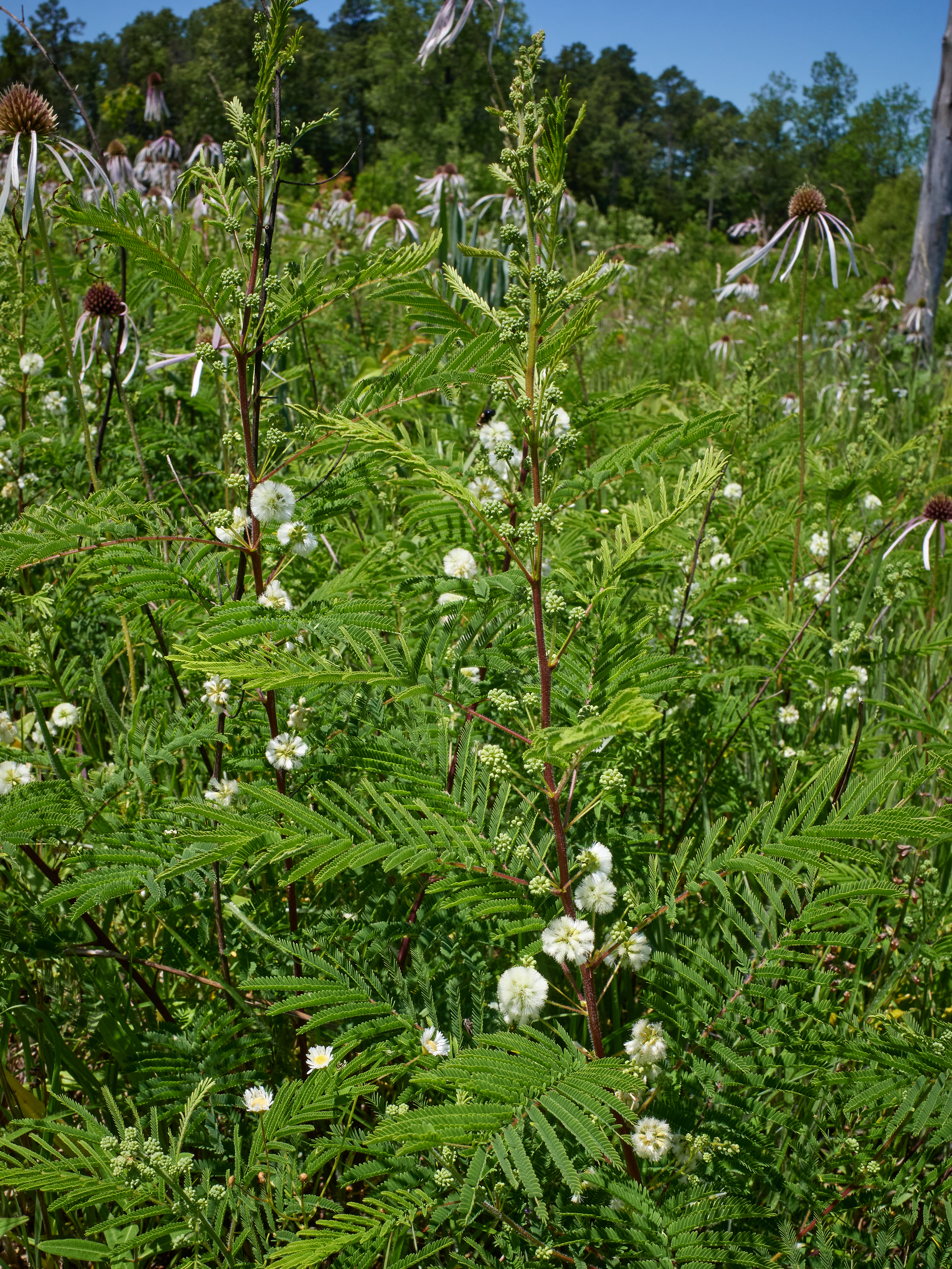

Conservation status
- Least Concern (IUCN 3.1)

- Secure (NatureServe)

Scientific classification
- Kingdom: Plantae
- Clade: Tracheophytes
- Clade: Angiosperms
- Clade: Eudicots
- Clade: Rosids
- Order: Fabales
- Family: Fabaceae
- Subfamily: Caesalpinioideae
- Clade: Mimosoid clade
- Genus: Acaciella
- Species: A. angustissima

Binomial name
- Acaciella angustissima (Mill.) Britton & Rose

Varieties
- Acaciella angustissima var. angustissima (Mill.) Britton & Rose; Acaciella angustissima var. chisosiana Isely; Acaciella angustissima var. hirta (Torrey & A.Gray) Robinson; Acaciella angustissima var. shrevei (Britton & Rose) Isely; Acaciella angustissima var. suffrutescens (Rose) Isely; Acaciella angustissima var. texensis (Torrey & A.Gray) Isely
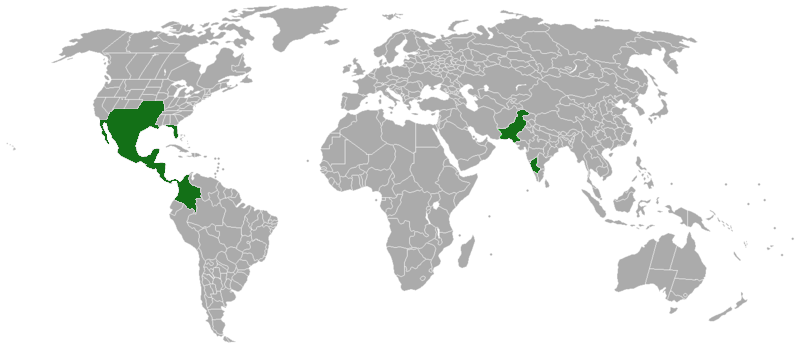
- Range of Acaciella angustissima

Synonyms
- Acacia angulosa Bertol.; Acacia angustissima (Mill.) Kuntze; Acacia elegans M.Martens & Galeotti; Acacia filicina Willd.; Acacia filicioides (Cav.) Trel.; Acacia glabrata Schltdl.; Acacia hirsuta Schltdl.; Acacia insignis M. Martens & Galeotti; Acacia pittieriana Standl.; Acaciella angulosa (Bertol.) Britton & Rose; Acaciella costaricensis Britton & Rose; Acaciella holtonii Britton & Killip; Acaciella martensis Britton & Killip; Acaciella rensonii Britton & Rose; Acaciella santanderensis Britton & Killip; Mimosa angustissima Mill.; Mimosa filicioides Cav.; Mimosa ptericina Poir.

= Acaciella angustissima =

Species of plant

Acaciella angustissima, commonly known as the prairie acacia, white-ball acacia, ocpatl, or palo de pulque, is a species of legume most recognized for its drought tolerance and its ability to be used as a green manure and ground covering. It is a perennial, deciduous, and belongs to the family Fabaceae (beans/legumes) and as it grows it starts as a shrub but eventually matures to a small tree. The tree has a high density of leaves along with small clumps of white flowers and creates 4–7 cm (1.6–2.8 in) long seed pods.

Acaciella angustissima is found in tropical areas around the equator since its water needs can vary from 750 to 2,500 mm a year. It has an advantage it can withstand a moderate drought, since its leaves are retained even in long dry periods. Aside from being drought tolerant, A. angustissima also has the benefit of being a green manure, since it has such a high leaf density, but also loses the majority of its leaves each season. The leaves can be used in composting or can be saved and used as livestock feed. It should only be used as an additive to the feed as it is toxic in high doses.

== Description ==
Acaciella angustissima is normally a shrub but can also look like a small tree when fully grown, since its height can vary from 2–7 m depending on the growing conditions. Large clumps of small white flowers cover the branches of the bush. The flowers have 5 petals with a large number of stamens extended far past the petals. The plant also produces a small seedpod that starts out green, but then turns brown when fully matured. The seedpods usually have a length of 4–7 cm, and are 6–8 mm wide. The leaves which are one of the plant's key traits are made up of 10–20 pairs of long thin leaves that go down a stem. They come in pairs of 3–12. One unique feature of A. angustissima is that it is thornless unlike most members of the genus Acacia (which it formerly belonged to).

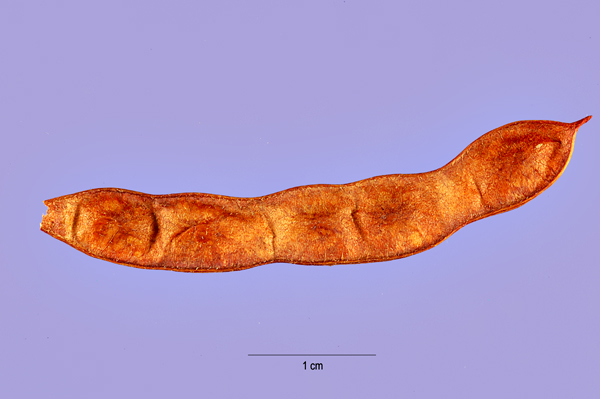
Fruit (bean)

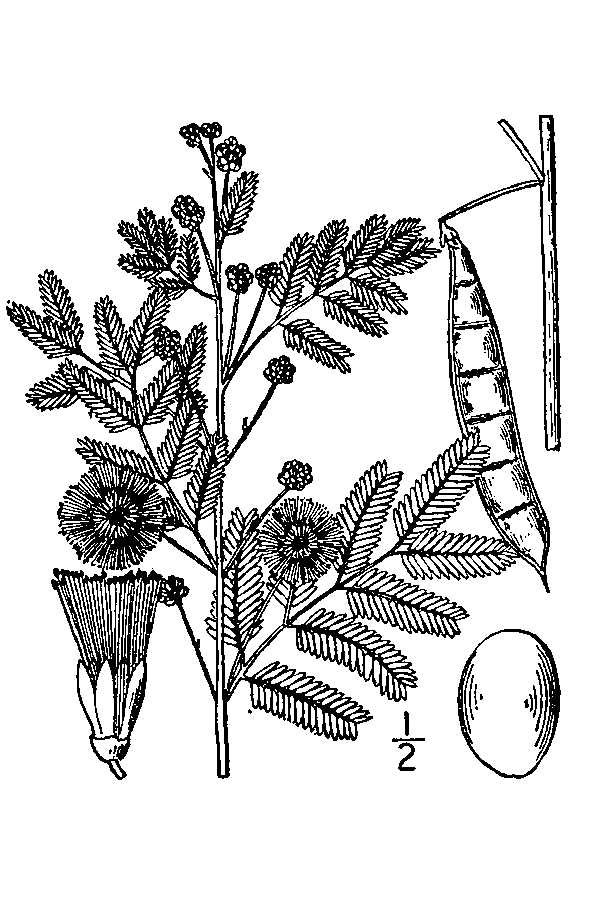
Illustration

== Distribution and habitat ==
Acaciella angustissima comes from the plant family Fabaceae. It only grows in very wet parts of the world, usually around the equator due to its large consumption of water. It is native to southern parts of North America, the Caribbean and the majority of South America. However, it is able to grow at almost any elevation and usually prefers a warm climate of 25–30 degrees Celsius. Acaciella angustissima is still one of the many crops under-utilized and researched. Luckily there is hope, roughly 20 years ago researches started evaluating it in tropical areas such as Zimbabwe.

Altitude: 0–2,600 m
Annual temperature mean: 5–30 deg. C.
Annual rainfall mean: 895–2870 mm
Soil: A. angustissima is well-suited for acidic, low-nutrient soils and it has very good resistance to drought.

== Cultivation ==
There are many constraints restricting A. angustissima from wider adoption. For instance, the amount of water it needs to survive is 3–4 times the amount of rainfall found in northern Africa. Additionally, A. angustissima can act as a rapidly spreading weed.

Because it has turned into a weed in its native habitat, the species should only be used in a controlled environment or when absolutely necessary. The only times it should be considered are when dealing with a harsh conditions where only weeds can survive, and some type of ground cover is needed to help with erosion control. If these circumstances are true, then the expected final height of the plant should be kept in mind when planting to prevent over crowding. Intercropping would also be complementary, by allowing farmers to take advantage of the unused space between plants, the nitrogen fixing habit, and the shade provided by the bushy branches. Due to the complex structure of the leaves it can take a year for them to decompose and release nutrients into the soil. To create a seed bank, it is important to remove all the seeds from the pod, and then clean them before storing, so that the pod does not break down and start attracting insects.

Since A. angustissima is a shrub, it propagates (spreads) through its seeds or clippings. The clippings should be taken from a somewhat hard branch, to better support themselves when transplanted. Acaciella angustissima should be planted in March or April in soil that has good drainage and is more on the acidic side on the pH scale. To be most effectively utilized it should be used to prevent erosion, since it has such a large root system. This is also one of its downfalls, since when it is intercropped with other species its roots can be a major competitor for vital nutrients. Luckily its fallen leaves can provide enough N, K, and P to keep smaller nearby plants healthy, and provide some shade at the same time. Acaciella angustissima is self-sustaining and does not need fertilizer, but has been found to respond well to fertilizer when added. However, the plant has a large water requirement. It requires a minimum rain fall of 700 mm but can handle up to 3,000 mm.

== Toxicity ==
A. angustissima contains roughly 10% tannins, which is the plant's natural defense mechanism. The taste created by the tannins is not usually welcomed, and the compound itself negatively affects livestock digestive systems.

== Uses ==
=== Alcoholic beverages ===
The bark is used in the production of alcoholic beverages. The root is used in the drink pulque in Mexico.

=== Forage ===
The seeds of Acaciella angustissima are high in protein and are somewhat useful as forage for livestock. The tree has a tannin content of 6%, which inhibits the ability of livestock to make use of the tree's protein.

=== Medicine ===
The indigenous Tzotzil and Tzeltal Maya people of Mexico use A. angustissima to treat digestive tract problems. They also use it to treat toothache, rheumatoid arthritis and cuts of the skin. Experiments have shown that A. angustissima mildly inhibits the growth of Escherichia coli and Staphylococcus aureus.
