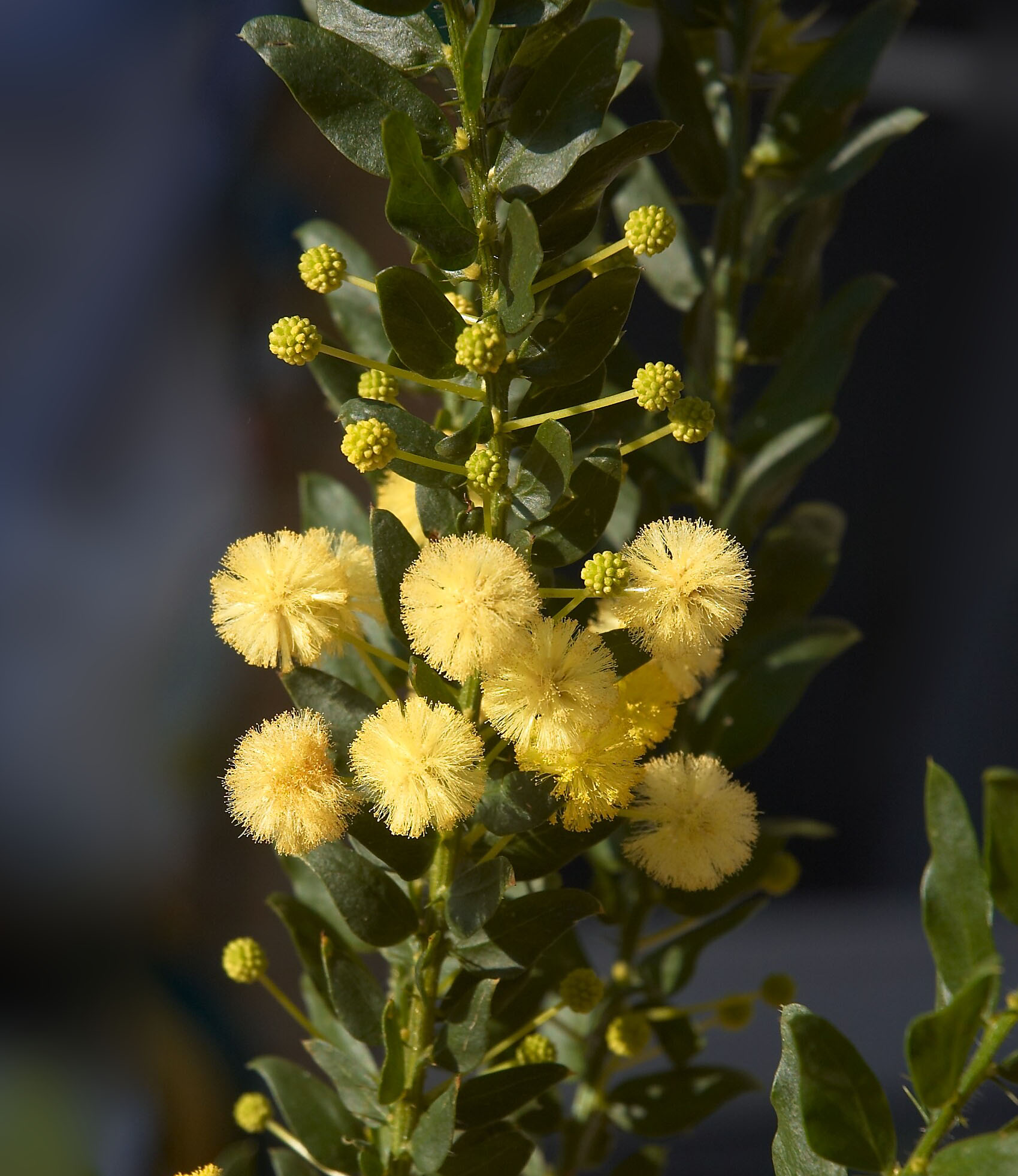

Scientific classification
- Kingdom: Plantae
- Clade: Tracheophytes
- Clade: Angiosperms
- Clade: Eudicots
- Clade: Rosids
- Order: Fabales
- Family: Fabaceae
- Subfamily: Caesalpinioideae
- Clade: Mimosoid clade
- Genus: Acacia
- Species: A. paradoxa

Binomial name
- Acacia paradoxa DC.
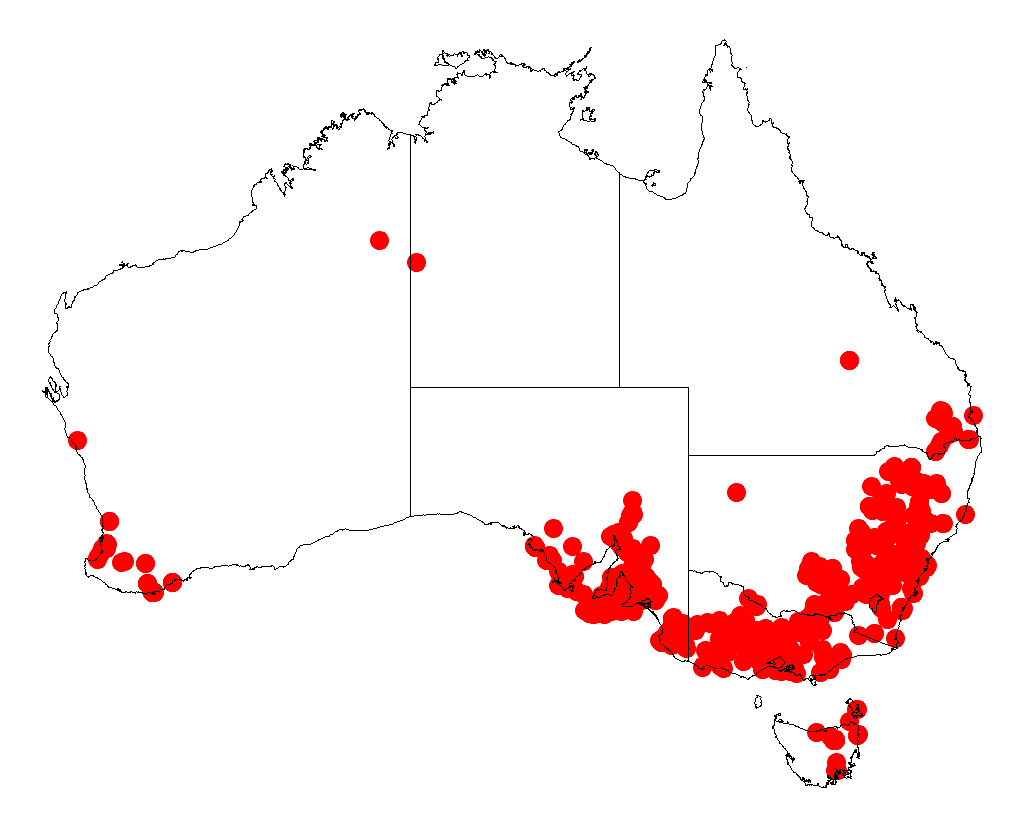
- Occurrence data from AVH

Synonyms
- Homotypic Synonyms; Acacia armata var. angustifolia Benth.; Acacia armata var. paradoxa (DC.) Ser.; Acacia undulata Spin, Jard. St. Sebastien; Mimosa paradoxa (DC.) Dum.Cours.; Racosperma paradoxum (DC.) Pedley Heterotypic Synonyms; Acacia armata R.Br.; Acacia armata var. longipedunculata Regel; Acacia armata var. microphylla Benth.; Acacia armata f. ornithophora (Sweet) Siebert & Voss; Acacia armata var. ornithophora (Sweet) Benth.; Acacia armata var. pendula Seem.; Acacia armata var. typica Domin; Acacia armata var. undulata (Siebert & Voss) Riebe; Acacia armata f. undulata (Link) Siebert & Voss; Acacia armatoides Walp.; Acacia falcifolia Hoffmanns.; Acacia furcifera Lindl.; Acacia ornithophora Sweet; Acacia undulata Willd. ex Spreng.; Acacia undulata Willd. ex H.L.Wendl.; Acacia undulata var. elegans Jacques; Acacia undulata var. longispina Vis.; Phyllodoce armata (R.Br.) Link; Phyllodoce undulata Link; Racosperma armatum (R.Br.) Mart.; Racosperma undulatum Mart.

= Acacia paradoxa =

Species of plant

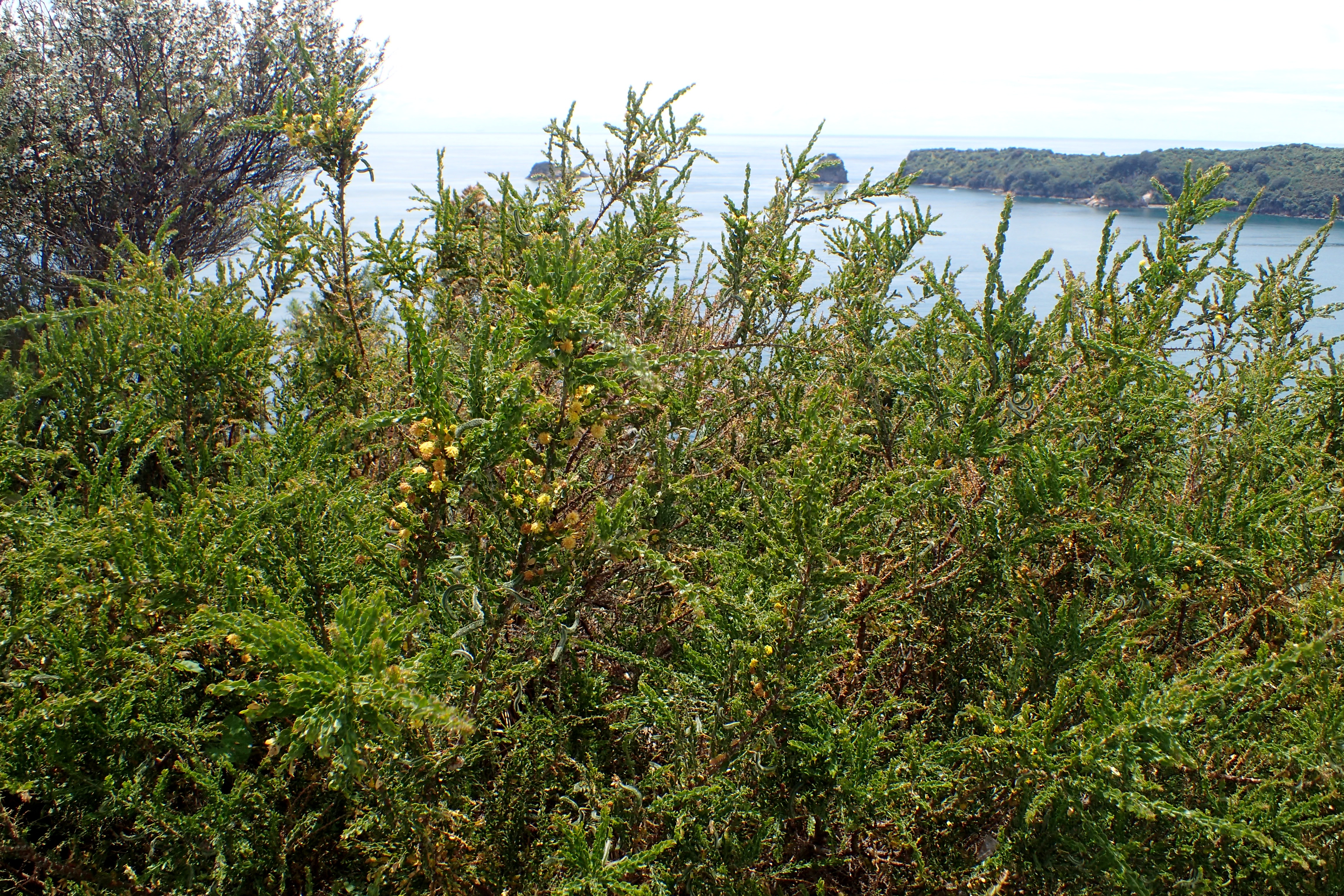
Habit

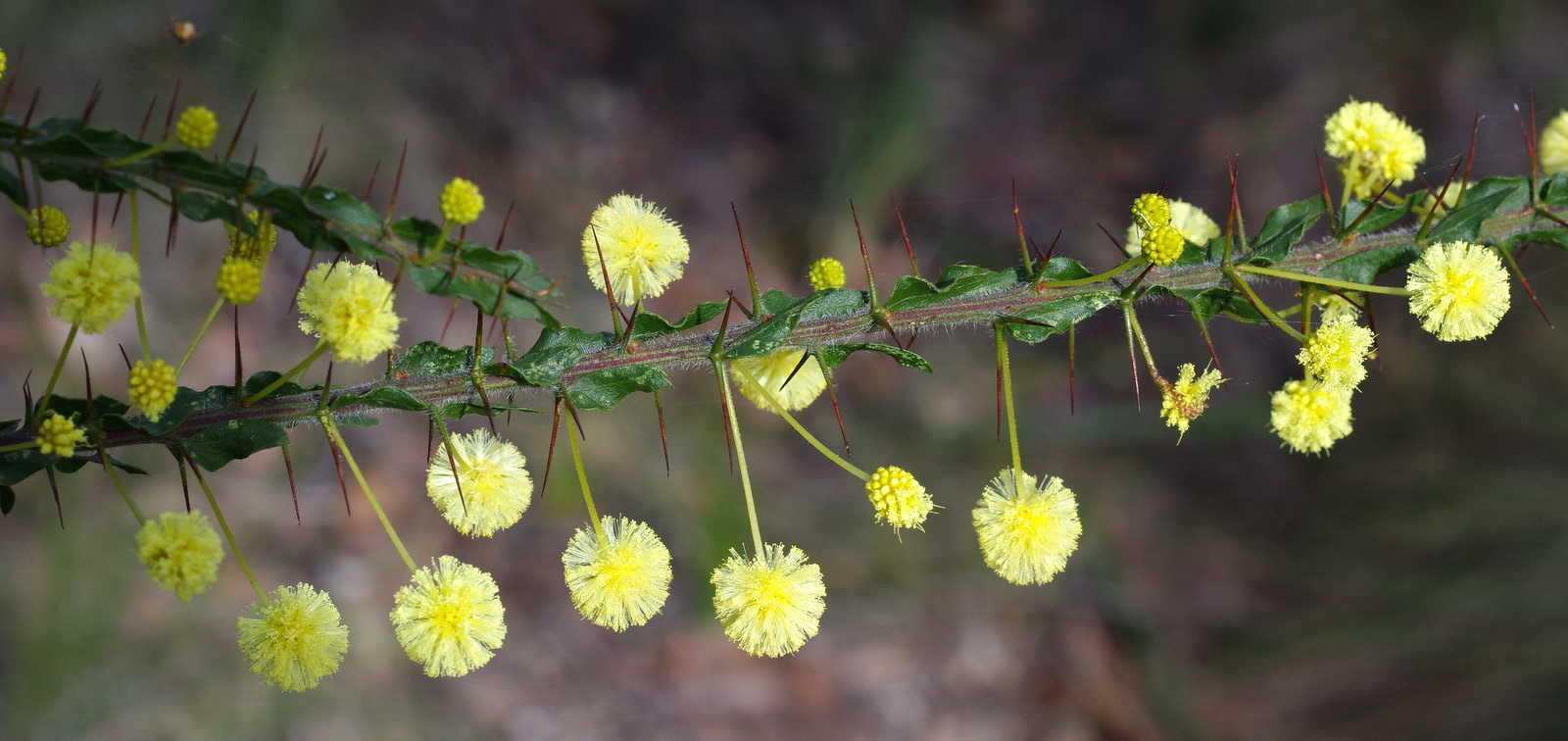
Foliage, stipules and flowers

Acacia paradoxa is a plant in the family Fabaceae. Its common names include kangaroo acacia, kangaroo thorn, prickly wattle, hedge wattle and paradox acacia.

== Description ==
The large shrub or tree up to 2 to 4 metres (7 to 13 ft) tall and has a similar width, it has ribbed branchlets that are often arched downward. It is dense with foliage; the leaves are actually enlarged petioles known as phyllodes. They are crinkly and the new ones are covered in hairs. The erect phyllodes are asymmetric and have a lanceolate shape and are around 30 millimetres (1.18 in) in length and 7 mm (0.276 in) wide. The bush is also full of long spines. It usually flowers between August and November producing an axillary flower-spike with small, bright yellow spherical flower heads and the fruits are brown pods 4 to 7 centimetres (1.6 to 2.8 in) long. The hard black seeds within have an oblong shape and are about 6 mm (0.236 in) in length and half as wide.

The spiny stipules that grow at the base of the phyllodes deter livestock from feeding on or too close to the plant.

== Taxonomy ==
The species was first formally described by the botanist Augustin Pyramus de Candolle in 1813 as part of the work Catalogus Plantarum Horti Botanici Monspeliensis. The species name is from the Greek words para which means near and doxa meaning glory. This probably refers the unattractive and thorny shrub being quite showy when it is in bloom.

Many synonyms are known for the plant including; Acacia ornithophora, Acacia undulata, Mimosa paradoxa, Racosperma paradoxum, Acacia armata and Acacia hybrida.

== Distribution ==
Kangaroo thorn is widely spread across Australia, regenerating from seed after disturbances, such as bush fire. Small birds, including wrens, use this plant as shelter and dwelling, while it is relied upon as a food source for moths, butterflies and other insects, birds also feed on its seeds.

It is endemic to south eastern parts of South Australia, much of Victoria, eastern New South Wales and south eastern parts of Queensland. It has become naturalised in parts of Western Australia and Tasmania.

The plant has also been introduced to other continents. In the United States, kangaroo thorn is a well-known noxious weed in California.

== Cultivation ==
The plant is used as an ornamental or as a dense screening plant. It make an excellent habitat and food source for birds. It grows well in full sun or in a partly shaded position. It can be planted in dry to moist well-drained areas. Seeds require pre-treatment such as scarification prior to planting.
