= Shittah tree =

Acacia-like tree species mentioned in the Hebrew Bible

Shittah tree (Hebrew: שִׁטָּה) or the plural "shittim" was used in the Tanakh to refer to trees belonging to the genera Vachellia and Faidherbia (both formerly classed in Acacia). Faidherbia albida, Vachellia seyal, Vachellia tortilis, and Vachellia gerrardi can be found growing wild in the Sinai Desert and the Jordan River Valley.

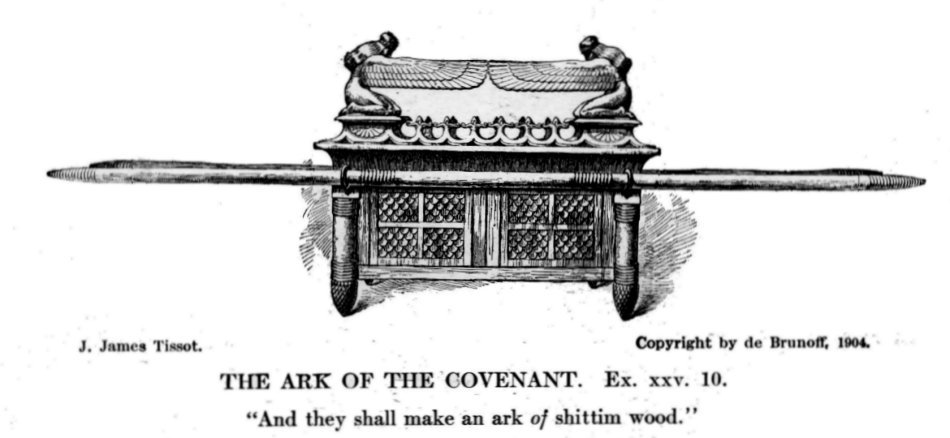
A depiction of Ark of the Covenant

In the Exodus, the ancient Israelites were commanded to use "shittah wood" to make various parts of the Tabernacle and of the Ark of the Covenant. This was most likely Vachellia seyal or Vachellia tortilis.

"The wild acacia (Vachellia nilotica), under the name of sunt, everywhere represents the seneh, or senna, of the burning bush. A slightly different form of the tree, equally common under the name of seyal, is the ancient shittah, or, as more usually expressed in the plural form, the shittim, of which the Tabernacle was made."

== See also ==
- Cotinus obovatus, a North American southern and western native plant sharing common names with the Biblical shittah tree
- Frangula purshiana, a North American Pacific northwestern native plant sharing common names with the Biblical shittah tree
- Sideroxylon lanuginosum, a North American southern, central, and western native plant sharing common names with the Biblical shittah tree
- Xylosma maidenii, an Australian native plant known as shitum wood
