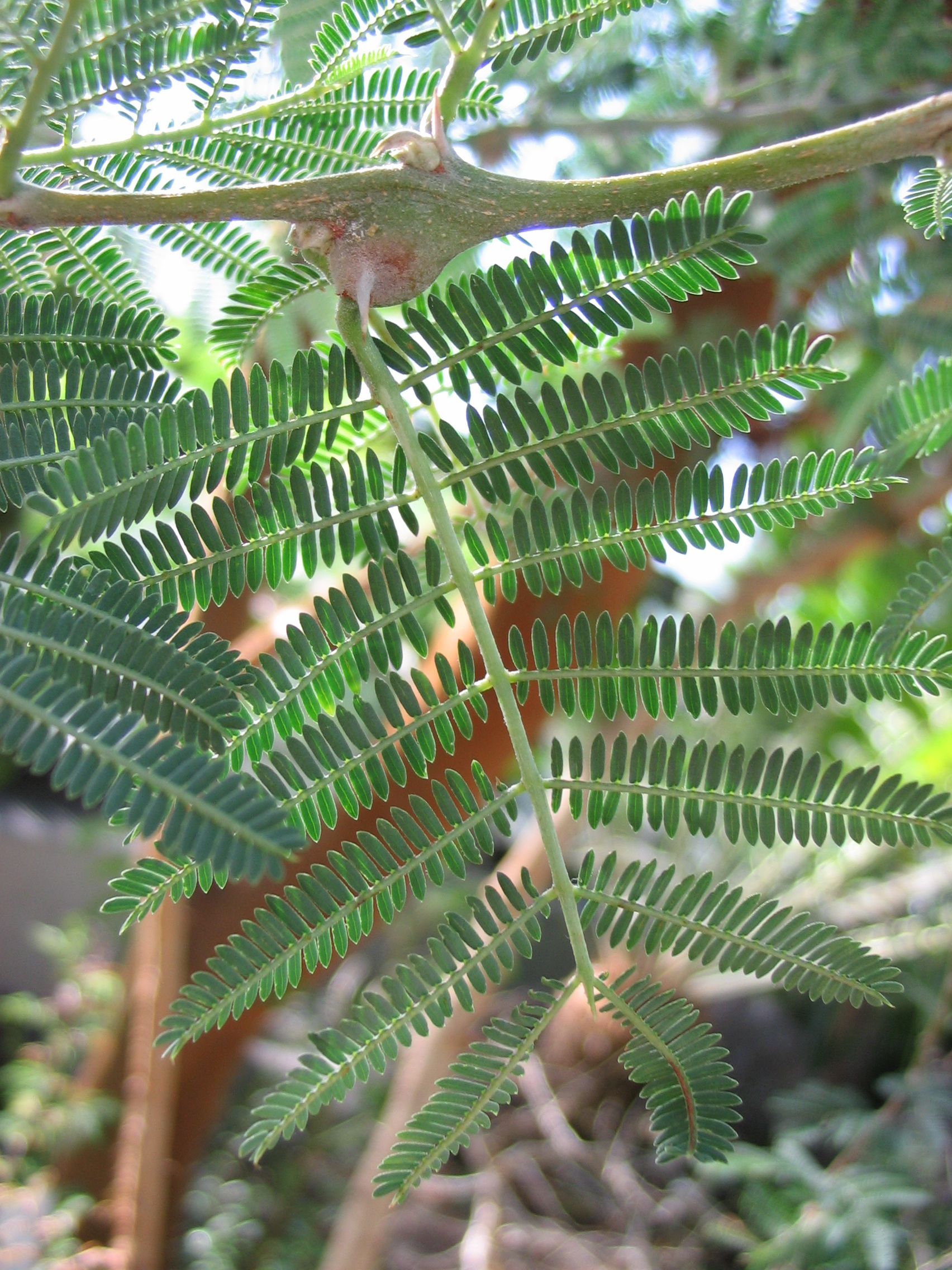

Conservation status
- Least Concern (IUCN 3.1)

Scientific classification
- Kingdom: Plantae
- Clade: Embryophytes
- Clade: Tracheophytes
- Clade: Angiosperms
- Clade: Eudicots
- Clade: Rosids
- Order: Fabales
- Family: Fabaceae
- Subfamily: Caesalpinioideae
- Clade: Mimosoid clade
- Genus: Vachellia
- Species: V. seyal

Binomial name
- Vachellia seyal (Delile) P.J.H.Hurter

Varieties
- Vachellia seyal var. fistula (Schweinf.) Kyal. & Boatwr.; Vachellia seyal var. seyal (Delile) P.J.H.Hurter

Synonyms
- Acacia fistula Schweinf.; Acacia flava (Forssk.) Schweinf. var. seyal (Delile) Roberty; Acacia seyal Delile; Acacia stenocarpa A.Rich.

= Vachellia seyal =

Red acacia

Species of plant

Vachellia seyal, the red acacia, known also as the shittah tree (the source of shittim wood), is a thorny, 6– to 10-m-high (20 to 30 ft) tree with a pale greenish or reddish bark.

== Description ==
At the base of the 3–10 cm (1.2–3.9 in) feathery leaves, two straight, light grey thorns grow to 7–20 cm (2.8–7.9 in) long. The blossoms are displayed in round, bright yellow clusters about 1.5 cm (0.59 in) in diameter.

In Vachellia seyal var. fistula, which is more common on heavy clay soils, some of the thorns are swollen as domatia, housing mutualistic ants such as Crematogaster.

In Africa, it is native to many countries, from Morocco in the north to Mozambique in the south. In the Sahara, it often grows in damp valleys. It is also found in wadis on the Arabian Peninsula.

== Varieties ==
Two varieties are recognized:

- Vachellia seyal var. fistula (Schweinf.) Kyal. & Boatwr.
- Vachellia seyal var. seyal

== Hybrids ==
Vachellia seyal occasionally hybridizes with V. xanthophloea.

== Uses ==
=== Gum arabic ===
Vachellia seyal is, along with other Vachellias, an important source for gum arabic, a natural polysaccharide, that exudes from damaged stems and solidifies. The gum of V. seyal is called gum talha, from Arabic طلح ṭalḥ, a term for any fruiting tree.

=== Tannin ===
Parts of the tree have a tannin content of up to 18-20%. The bark and seed pods of V. seyal var. seyal have a tannin content of around 20%.

=== Wood ===
Wood from the tree is recorded to have been used in Ancient Egypt to make coffins and also the Ark of the Covenant.

=== Medicinal uses ===
==== Bark ====
The bark is used to treat dysentery and bacterial infections of the skin, such as leprosy. It is also used as a stimulant.

==== Gum ====
The gum is used as an aphrodisiac, to treat diarrhoea, as an emollient, and to treat hemorrhaging, inflammation of the eye, intestinal ailments, and rhinitis. It is used to ward off arthritis and bronchitis.

==== Wood ====
Incense from the wood is used to treat pain from rheumatism and to keep expectant mothers from contracting rhinitis and fevers.

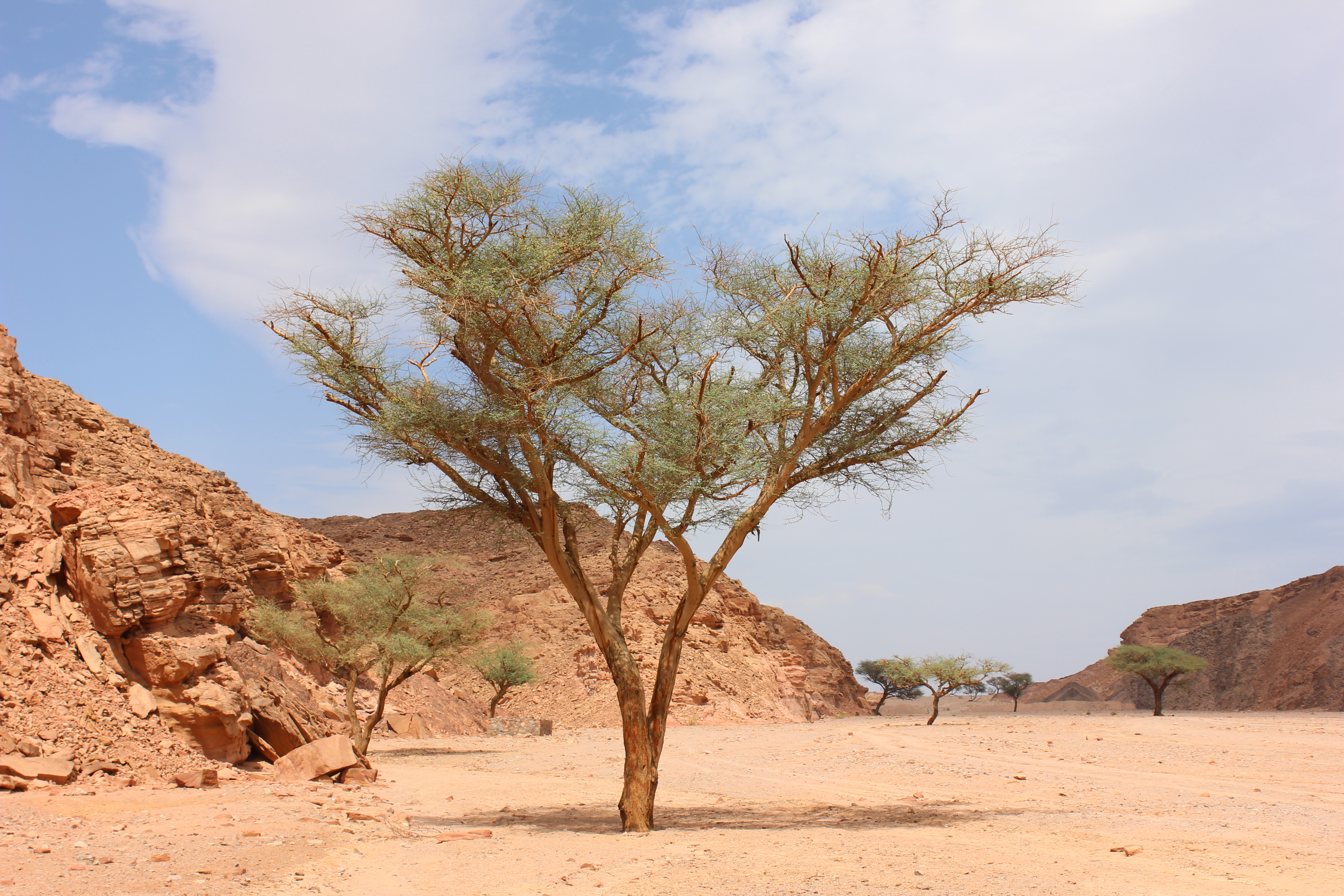
Tree in Ain Khudra Oasis, Nuweiba, Sinai Peninsula, Egypt

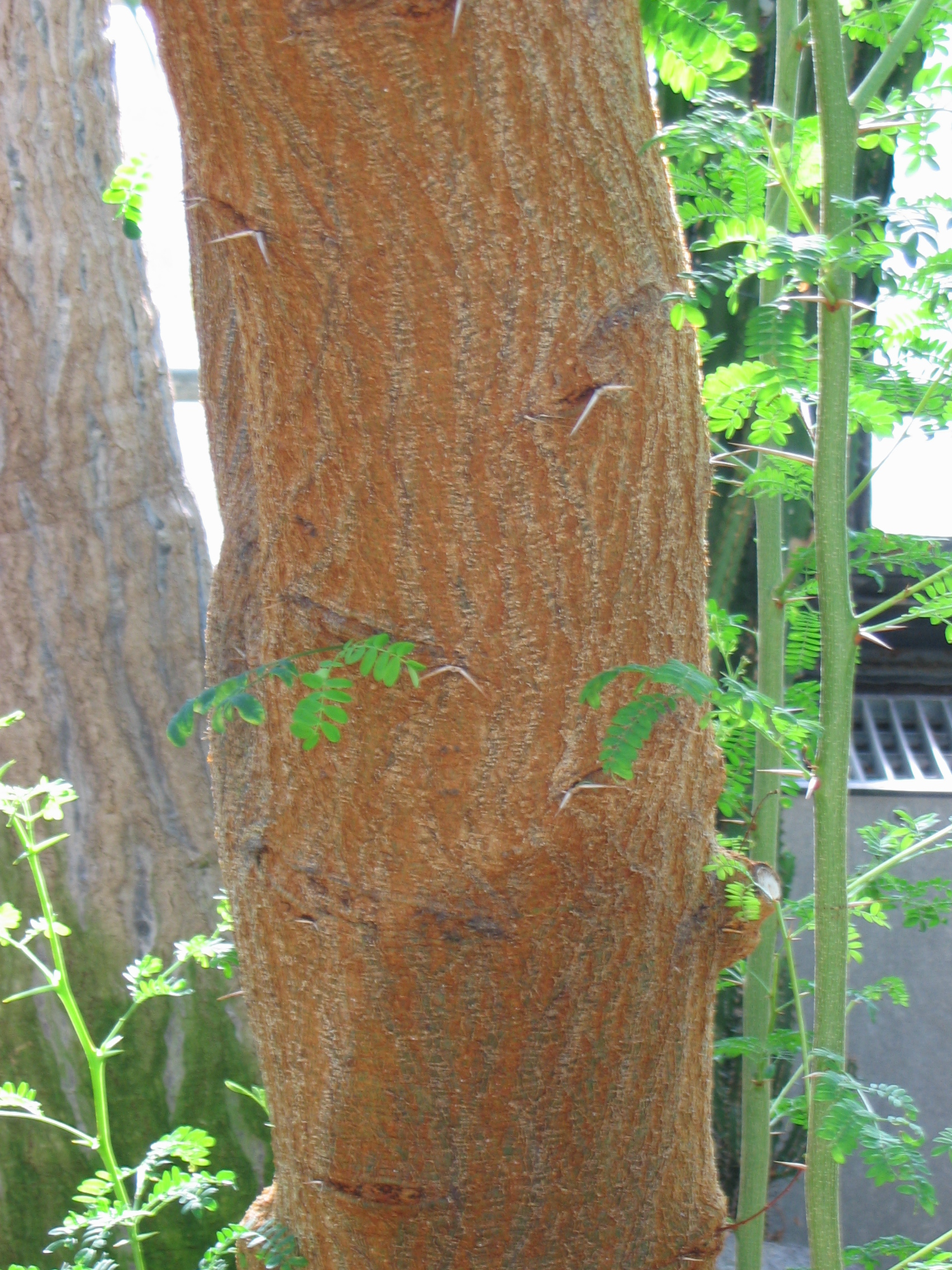
Bark

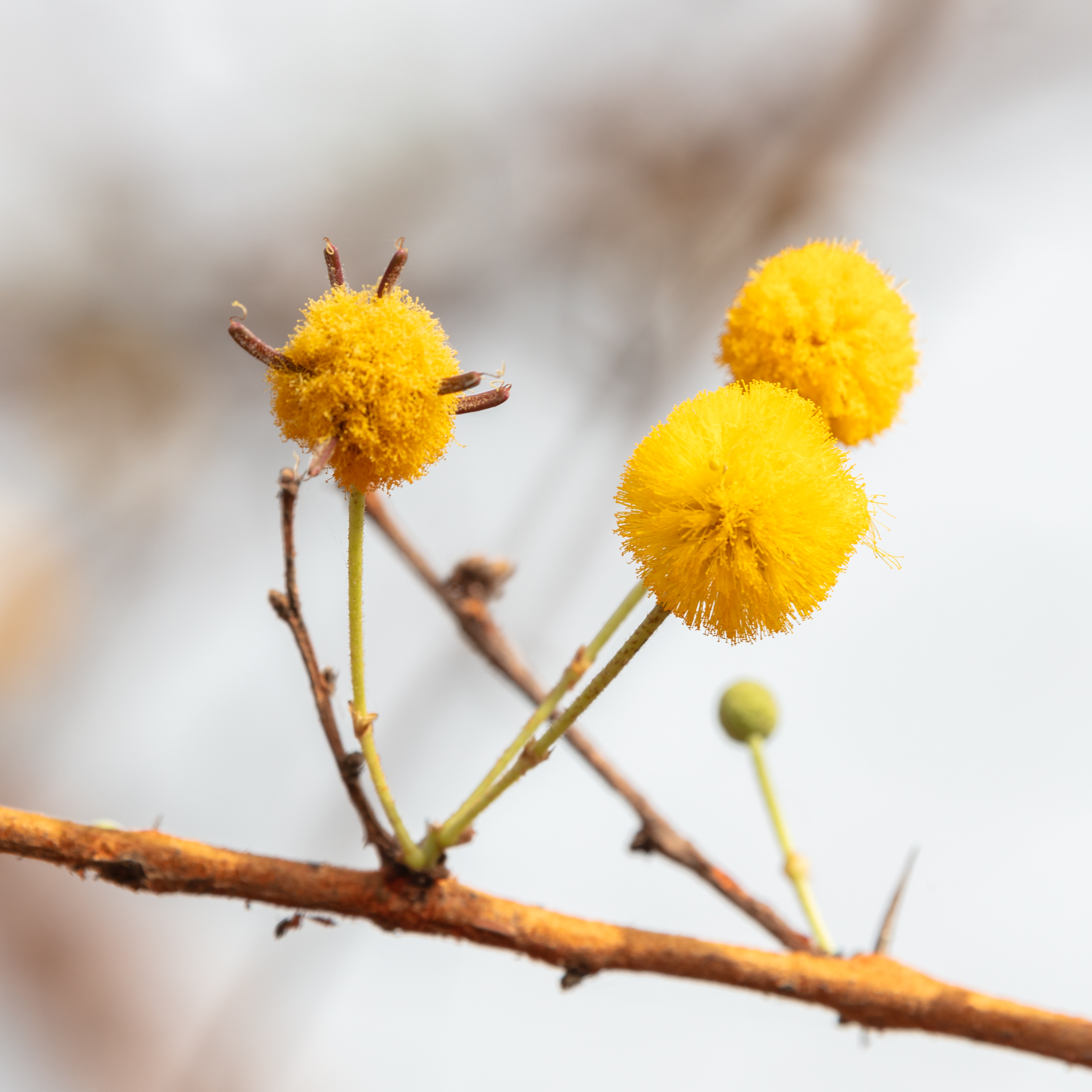
Flower

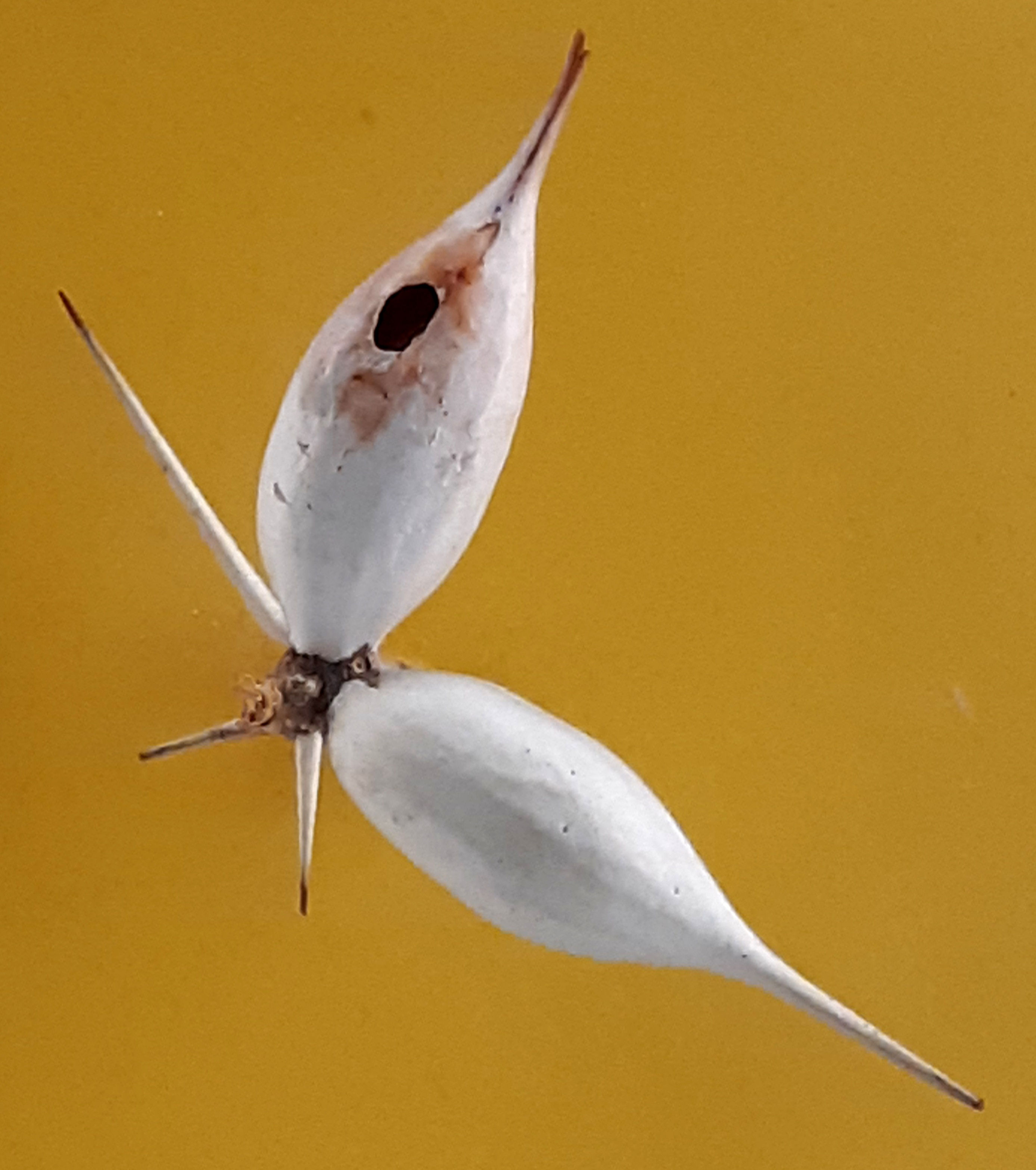
Domatia for symbiotic ants in the tree's swollen hollow spines

== See also ==
- Talhah (name)
