= List of ecoregions affected by woody plant encroachment =

List of ecoregions affected by a specific vegetation regime shift

This list describes woody plant encroachment specific to different ecoregions of the world. The list is further subdivided into countries. Although political boundaries usually have limited influence on the occurrence of woody plant encroachment in an ecosystem, this structure provides insight into country-specific scientific research and responses.

== Ecoregions ==
=== Northern Europe ===
==== Scandinavia and the Baltic ====
Woody encroachment is common in the Alpine tundra of Norway and Sweden. Also in the Coastal meadows of Estonia woody plant encroachment is observed, resulting from land abandonment. In Denmark, dry grasslands are affected by woody encroachment.

==== United Kingdom ====
In the United Kingdom, shrub encroachment in heathlands may lead to the loss of ecosystem carbon, as carbon losses from the soil will not be offset by above-ground carbon in the additional biomass.

==== Ireland ====
In the Burren of Ireland, extensive low input farming helps to prevent further encroachment by Blackthorn and Hazel, while high density stands are actively thinned out.

=== Eurasian Steppe ===
Caragana shrubs are the primary contributor to woody encroachment in the Eurasian steppe, among others in the Black Sea-Kazakhstan steppe, the Tibetan Plateau steppe, and the Central Asian steppe. Woody plant encroachment is observed in parts of the Ukrainian steppe.

=== Central Europe and European Alps ===
Woody plant encroachment is common in the Alps. Recorded expansion rates range from 0.6% to 16% per year and 5.6% per decade. Open land that was formerly forested requires continuous maintenance to prevent woody plant encroachment. When active land cultivation ends, fallow land is the result and gradual spread of shrubs and bushes can follow. Animal species once native to Central Europe effectively countered this natural process. These include herbivores such as European bison, aurochs (extinct), red deer and feral horse. Grassland and heath are considered to require protection due to their biodiversity as well as to preserve cultural landscapes. Woody plant encroachment is therefore frequently countered with selective removal of woody biomass or through the seasonal or year-round introduction of grazing animal species, such as sheep, goats, heck cattle or horses. In the Alps, structural change in agriculture leads to the abandonment of land and subsequent encroachment. Alnus viridis is the most widely distributed shrub species in the sub-alpine zone and is found to severely impair species richness and beta diversity when encroaching grassland. Also Bilberry is a common encroaching species in the sub-alpine belt. Woody encroachment in the alpine tundra is associated with aboveground carbon storage and a slowdown of the biogeochemical cycle. Seventy percent of cultivated land in the Eastern Alps is affected by woody encroachment. Also in Hungary bush encroachment is linked to the abandonment of formerly cultivated land. Moderate encroachment is found to have no negative impact on biodiversity and suppression of woody plants is considered an effective restoration approach.

=== Mediterranean Basin ===
The Mediterranean region is widely reported to be affected by bush encroachment, which is often a transition into the establishment of trees in former grasslands. This is found to have negative effects on biodiversity and to magnify climate and related droughts. Further, it adversely affects soil organic matter. At the same time encroaching shrubs are also found to have a positive effect, reversing the desertification process. Areas experiencing woody encroachment have more extended droughts and higher usage of deep water and this is expected to increase under future climate scenarios. In the Spanish Pyrenees, woody encroachment is connected to land abandonment and affects around 80 percent of cultivated land. It is increasingly observed that the cessation of land use is not the only driver of woody encroachment in the Mediterranean Basin, as the phenomenon also occurs in areas that continue to be used for agriculture.

==== Spain ====
Livestock decline and changes in grazing patterns have favoured the encroachment of various woody species in the Pyrenees. The encroachment was found to have a significant impact on soil properties, but not increased soil organic carbon accumulation. In the Pyrenees, mechanical uprooting of shrubs was found to be effective for the purpose of restoring a productive grass layer. In the La Rioja region in Spain, systematic shrub clearing was introduced in the 1980s, aiming to enhance ecosystem services on abandoned and encroached farmland. Assessments show a positive effect on fire frequency, species diversity, soil health, soil carbon sequestration and hydrological connectivity and water resources. In the Saja-Besaya Natural Park, in the province of Cantabria, experiments were conducted with prescribed fires as a grassland conservation tool.

==== Italy ====
Research in the Italian Alps and Sicily found that woody encroachment, following changes in land use, can lead to decreases in ecosystem carbon storage at wetter sites, while leading to increases at drier sites.

==== Israel ====
Maquis encroachment occurs in Israel.

==== Palestine ====
In Palestinian oak scrub forest, heavy grazing maintained low shrub cover and height, while moderate grazing led to greater encroachment.

=== North American grasslands ===
North American grasslands have been found to be affected by woody plant encroachment. Documentation of shrub encroachment caused by fire exclusion was documented as early as 1968.

==== Canada ====
Woody plant encroachment contributes to grassland loss in Western Canada, especially in Aspen parkland. Further, enroachment occurs in the Canadian Arctic tundra. Also the creation of wetlands is associated with woody encroachment. A case study of the Cypress Hills Interprovincial Park found an annual increase of shrub cover of 1% between 2011 and 2018. In Saskatchewan, native grasslands are encroached by wolf willow, western snowberry and trembling aspen, among other native shrub and tree species.

==== United States of America ====
Woody plant expansion is considered one of the greatest contemporary threats to mesic grasslands of the central United States. Up to 330 million hectares of grassland are affected by woody encroachment. Affected ecosystems include the Chihuahuan Desert, the Sonoran Desert, the northern and southern Rocky Mountains, the sagebrush steppe, as well as the Southern and Central Great Plains. Various studies quantify the extent of grassland loss for different regions:

- The Great Plains biome is found to be at the brink of collapse due to woody encroachment, with 62% of Northern American grassland lost to date, and a resulting loss in potential grass biomass of 75%.
- In the western United States, 25% of rangelands experience sustained tree cover expansion, with estimated losses for agricultural producers of $5 billion since 1990. The forage lost annually is estimated to be equal to the consumption of 1.5 million bison or 1.9 million cattle. Woody plants have increased on around 44 million hectares in the western United States since 1999. In the Midwest, as little as 1-4% of original native tallgrass prairie is estimated to remain.
- Among encroaching species is Piñon-juniper which mostly encroaches in shrubland adjacent to wooded areas. Up to 350 sagebrush-associated plant and animal species are threatened as a result. In the northern Great Basin piñon-juniper has encroached 0.45 million hectares since 2001 alone. The rate at which grassland is lost to woody encroachment is found to equal the rate of conversion of grassland to agricultural land.
- Also the tundra ecosystems of Colorado and Alaska are affected by the rapid expansion of woody shrubs. In coastal fen ecosystems, woody plant encroachment leads to the reduction of herbaceous species richness and loss of rare species.
- Evidence suggests that although about 75 percent of southern New Mexico was covered in grasslands prior to the late 1800s, by the late 1960s only 5 percent grassland coverage remained.
- In the Chihuahuan Desert, an estimated 25 to 50 percent of the area that is currently covered by shrublands was actually grassland less than 200 years ago.

Poor grazing management and fire suppression are among the documented causes. In particular, historic livestock overgrazing has contributed to woody plant encroachment. Historically, the displacement of indigenous populations and the simultaneous elimination of fire-based land management are believed to be root causes of the observed regime shift. Also the absence of previously common large browsers, especially elk, is a contributing factor. Negative impacts on forage production and an interrelation with carbon sequestration are documented. At the same time in the semiarid karst savanna of Texas, USA, woody plant encroachment has been found to improve soil infiltrability and therewith groundwater recharge. At the same time a conversion of rangelands to redcedar woodland has been modeled to result in a 20-40% reduction in streamflow and therewith the amount of water available. Woody plant encroachment has been found to prevent the effective recharge of aquifers. Experiments showed positive results for increased water savings through woody plant control. Over a period of 69 years, woody encroachment in Texas has increased aboveground carbon stocks by 32%. Bird population decline as a result of woody encroachment has been identified as a critical conservation concern, with bird populations found to have decreased by nearly two-thirds over the last half-century. Through government funded conservation programmes, shrubs and trees are thinned out systematically in affected ecosystems. This is found to revive habitat for birds and improve other ecosystem services. There is evidence that selective thinning with post-treatment has successfully reversed the effects of conifer encroachment in studied areas. At the same time study areas in Nebraska, where Juniperus virginiana encroachment was treated with fire, showed that woody cover stayed low and stable for 8–10 years after fire treatment, but rapid re-encroachment then followed. In the Loess Canyons community driven partnerships among land owners for the purpose of coordinated prescribed fires, has shown to successfully halt and reverse woody plant encroachment, with positive effects for rangeland productivity and bird species richness. A notable initiative is the Prairie Project, funded by the United States Department of Agriculture, aiming to render the Great Plains more resilient against woody plant encroachment through targeted fire and grazing regimes. USDA conservation programs amount to close to $90 million annually in public and private funds for bush control and rangeland health.

==== Mexico ====
In the semiarid grassland–shrubland ecotone of the Central Mexican Plateau, shrubland area expanded by 18.2% between 1986 and 2020, from 472,369 to 558,768 hectares, while the extent of native grasslands declined by more than half. Under dry and warm climate extremes, the grasslands showed high thermal vulnerability whereas the shrublands remained functionally resilient, indicating a transition toward a woody-dominated state.

=== Latin American grasslands ===
==== Argentina ====
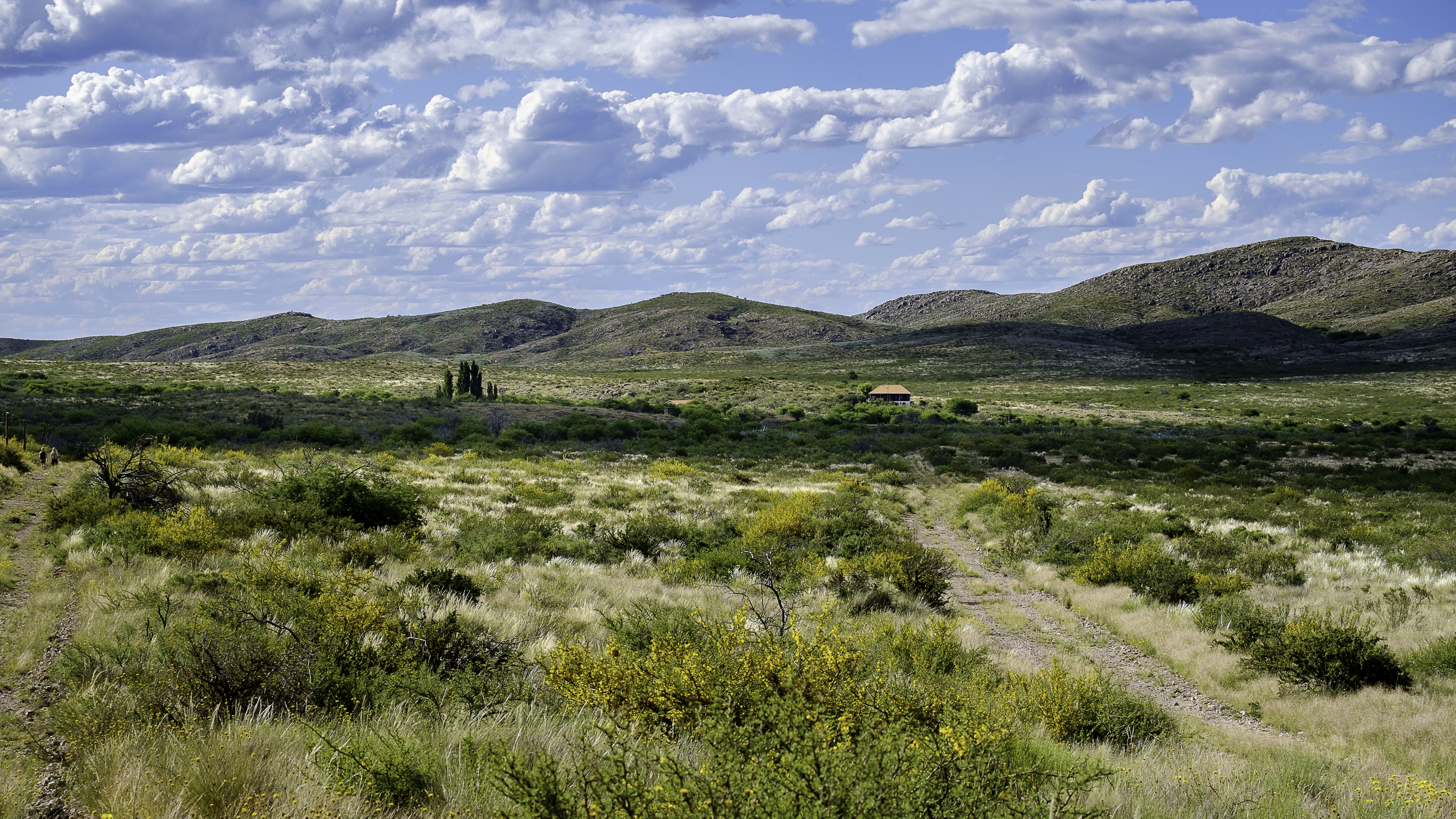
The Espinal ecoregion in Argentina

A total of approximately 5.7 million hectares of land are affected by woody encroachment in Argentinia. In the Gran Chaco intense shrub encroachment has detrimental impact on livestock economies, especially in the Formosa Province. Livestock pressure and the lack of wildfires have been main causes. Woody encroachment ist also observed in the savanna ecosystems of the central Argentine Espinal as well as the lower Argentine Monte. Among the encroaching species is Geoffroea decorticans. In Patagonia's drylands, successful trials of rehabilitation through mechanical shrub cutting and enhancing patch connectivity were conducted.

==== Bolivia ====
In Bolivia, different stages of woody plant encroachment threaten the habitat of the Guacano.

==== Brazil ====
Map of the Cerrado ecoregion in Brazil as delineated by the World Wide Fund for Nature

Woody encroachment is widespread in the Cerrado, a savannah ecosystem in central Brazil. Studies found that 19% of its area, approximately 17 million hectares, show significant woody encroachment. A remote-sensing analysis combining the plant area index derived from GEDI spaceborne lidar with trends in the enhanced vegetation index identified 15.5% of the remaining native vegetation of the Cerrado as potentially affected by woody encroachment. A 40% increase in wood cover reduced the diversity of plants by about 30%. Identified causes include fire suppression and land-use abandonment. Fire suppression is linked to Brazil's conservation policy that targets deforestation in the Amazon, but also limits fires in the Cerrado. Woody encroachment also disrupts ecohydrological processes. In encroached Cerrado wetlands, soil phosphorus and potassium concentrations were 62% and 50% lower, respectively, and cation saturation was reduced by 40%. In some areas of the Cerrado, open grassland and wetlands have largely disappeared. In Cerrado palm-swamp wetlands (veredas), woody encroachment reduced herbaceous-shrub species richness by 45%, while aboveground woody biomass was more than 300 times higher in encroached areas, increasing vegetation carbon stocks eightfold. The planting of monocultures, such as pine, for wood production also contributes to the loss of the natural Cerrado savanna ecosystem. When pine is removed and plantations abandoned, areas turn into low-diversity forests lacking savanna species. A 20-year study found that woody encroachment led to reduced species diversity and richness. Also in the highland grassland of Southern Brazil, bush encroachment caused by land management changes is seen as a significant threat to biodiversity, human wellbeing and cultural heritage in grassland ecosystems. Studies show that woody encroachment in the Cerrado has a significant impact on rodent species abundance, with positive effects for forest specialists and negative effects for grassland specialists. Controlled fires have been studied as a means to manage woody encroachment.

==== Nicaragua ====
In Nicaragua Vachellia pennatula is known to encroach due to land intensification as well as land abandonment.

==== Uruguay ====
An analysis of land-survey charts from the 19th and 20th centuries indicates that forests in the Uruguayan campos remained spatially stable while shrublands expanded, and woody vegetation is observed to rapidly cover areas from which cattle are excluded.

=== Caribbean Islands ===
==== Cuba ====
The Republic of Cuba experiences woody plant encroachment, mainly by Dichrostachys cinerea (locally called marabú). Encroacher wood is actively harvested and used for charcoal production and considered for electricity production.

=== Asian temperate savanna and steppe ===
==== China ====
Temperate savanna-like ecosystems in Northern China are found to be affected by shrub encroachment, linked to unsustainable grazing and climate change. In Inner Mongolia, shrubs encroach on the steppe. Woody plant encroachment is found to lead to the reduction of biodiversity and decreased forage quality. Rare herbaceous plants and those with lower stature are at risk of extinction. In Yunnan Province in Southwest China, the loss and fragmentation of savanna due to woody encroachment is found to be larger than the loss of forests. In marsh areas of the Sanjiang Plain, woody encroachment was found to significantly reduce soil moisture, organic carbon, and total nitrogen. Shrub encroachment has led to the decline of soil quality of up to 40% in Northwest China. In the Tibetan Plateau, woody encroachment is found to be one of the main grassland disturbance factors. Among the encroaching species is Potentilla fruticose. Encroachment has a significant influence on the water balance of the plateau. Modelling of net primary productivity under different stocking rates on the plateau indicates that shrub encroachment there is largely a passive response to overgrazing-driven grassland degradation rather than a result of enhanced shrub competitiveness, with shrubs expanding mainly in areas where grassland productivity has already substantially declined. Encroachment is further observed in the coastal wetlands of the abandoned Yellow River Delta in China, leading to a decline in herbaceous plant diversity and altering soil characteristics, potentially impacting the ecological balance and functioning of these wetland ecosystems. The determination of an optimal vegetation cover of tree and shrub species in China's drylands, is a subject of research.

==== India ====
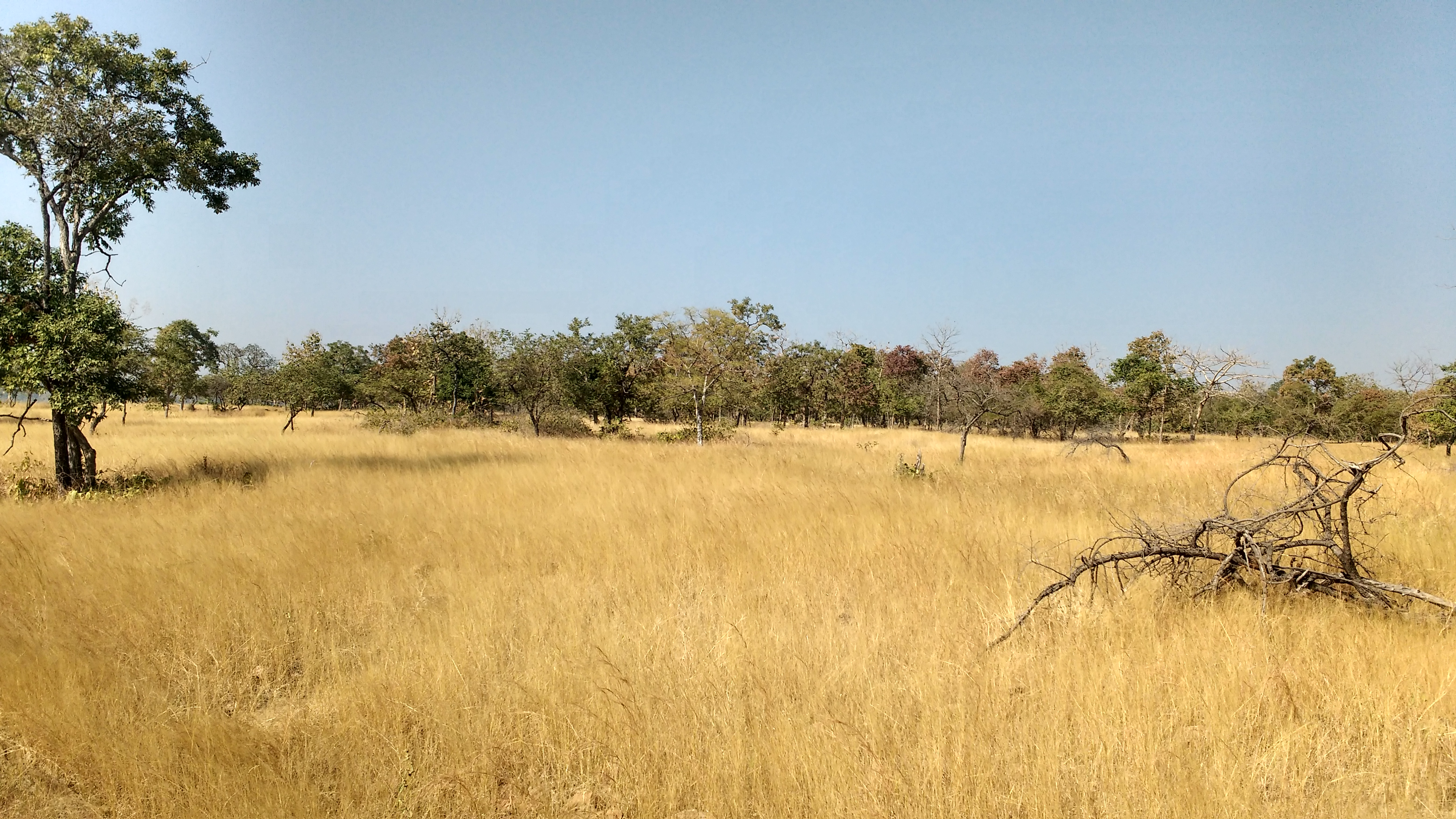
Grassland in India

Woody encroachment in India's grasslands involves both invasive species such as Prosopis juliflora and eucalyptus, and native woody species expanding due to disrupted fire and grazing regimes. This encroachment has reduced grassland cover by up to 34% in some protected areas, impacting species like the Bengal florican and grassland rodents. Among others, semi-arid Banni grasslands of western India are found to be affected by bush encroachment, which affects both species composition and behaviour of nocturnal rodents.

=== Asian subalpine mountains and moorlands ===
==== Japan ====
In Japan's Hakkoda Mountains woody plant encroachment occurs in subalpine moorlands, typically in areas with less snow, drier soil, and closer proximity to habitat edges, leading to reduced plant variety and favoring taller species that compete better for light and moisture.

==== Bhutan ====
The encroachment observed in the Chinese Tibetan Plateau and Himalayas, extends into Bhutan.

=== Australian lowland woodlands ===
In Australia woody encroachment is observed across all lowland grassy woodland as well as semi-arid floodplain wetlands and coastal ecosystems, with substantial implications for biodiversity conservation and ecosystem services. A total area of about 32 million hectares of land is affected by woody encroachment in Australia. It is therewith the dominant form of land cover change in the country, affecting around 6% of its total area. On Cape York Peninsula, woody plant encroachment has been identified as a driver of the decline of the endangered golden-shouldered parrot, whose nesting distribution contracted as canopy cover increased. Prescribed fire and adapted grazing regimes have been found to successfully reduce some encroaching species and restore grasslands. While the optimal fire regime is context specific, generally late dry season burning every 4 years was found to be most effective in Australia.

=== Eastern African grasslands ===
Across Eastern Africa, including protected areas, woody encroachment has been noted as a challenge. It has first been documented in the 1970s, with scientists indicating that woody encroachment is the rule rather than the exception in East Africa.

==== Ethiopia ====
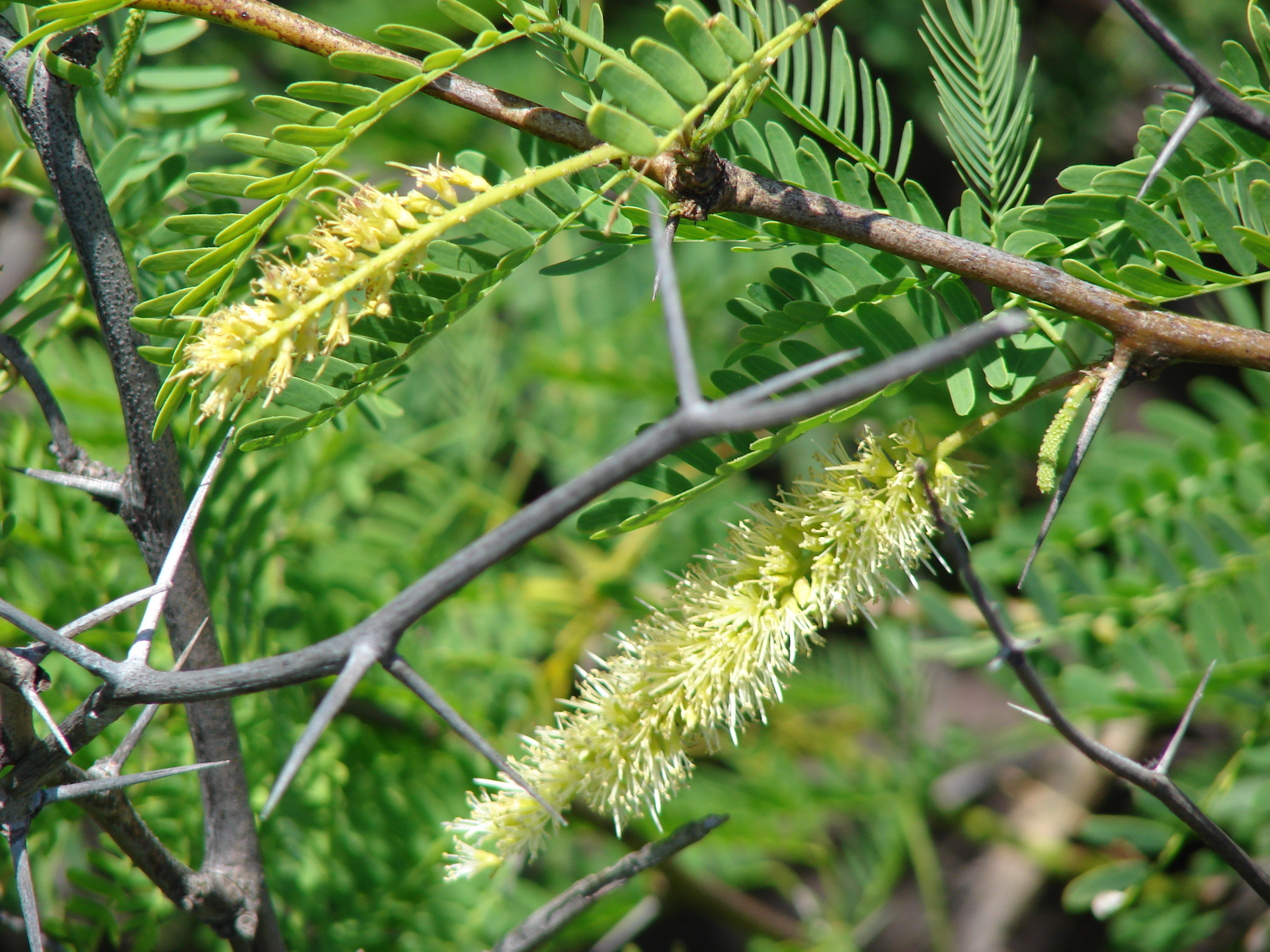
Flowers of Prosopis juliflora, a common invasive species in Ethiopia and other countries

Grasslands in the Borana Zone in southern Ethiopia are found to be affected by bush encroachment, specifically by Senegalia mellifera, Vachellia reficiens, Vachellia bussei and Vachellia oerfota. Woody plants constitute 50-80% of vegetation cover in encroached areas, with varying densities. Dominating encroacher species differ significantly between different elevations. Also in Northeastern Ethiopia, encroachment is a threat to rangelands. This negatively affects species richness and diversity of plant species. In the Senkelle Swayne's Hartebeest Sanctuary, the area covered by grassland declined by 9.8% while the total area covered by bushland increased by 21.4% over the past 30 years. Experiments have shown the effectiveness of bush control of different woody species by cutting and stem-burning, cutting with fire-browse combination, cutting and fire as well as cutting and browsing. Post-management techniques were effective in sustaining savanna ecology. A study in the Borana rangelands found that tree thinning at moderate intensity (67%) effectively reduces encroaching tree mortality and enhances grass diversity and herbaceous biomass. In the Bale lowlands, woody encroachment is found to have increased by 546% between 1990 and 2020, transforming grassland into bushland. Woody encroachment has also been observed in protected areas, such as the Nech Sar National Park, as well as community conservation areas, such as Guassa Community Conservation Area. Different stages of woody encroachment were identified in the Mago National Park, mainly by Capparaceae and Grewia. The government of Ethiopia has defined the scaling up of bush encroachment rehabilitation technologies a key activity in national strategies, such as the Ethiopia National Dairy Development Strategy 2022–2031. Studies identify the need for post-thinning practices, aimed at leveraging positive impact. Woody encroachment has been found to reduce herbage yield and therewith rangeland productivity. Under woody encroachment, less meat and milk is produced per head of cattle, which challenges traditional pastoral diets. The management of bush encroachment is found to stabilize rangelands and contribute to food security. In the Ganale Dawa River Basin in southern Ethiopia, modelling under climate change scenarios found that unmanaged bush encroachment increased agricultural drought severity by up to 21%, while intensive bush clearing reduced it by up to 26%. Shrub encroachment in forest areas of Ethiopia, such as the Desa'a Forest, reduces carbon stocks. Also the invasive species Prosopis juliflora has expanded rapidly since it was introduced in the 1970s, with direct negative consequences on pasture availability and therewith agriculture. Prosopis is native to Central America and was introduced in an attempt to halt land degradation and provide a source of firewood and animal fodder, but has since then encroached into various ecosystems and become a main driver of degradation. The Afar Region is most severely affected. The wood of the invasive species is commonly used as household fuel in the form of firewood and charcoal.

==== Kenya ====
In Kenya, woody encroachment has been identified as a main type of land-cover change in grasslands, reducing the grazing availability for pastoralists. Studied areas show an increase of woodland by 39% and a decrease of grassland by 74%, with Vachellia reficiens and Vachellia nubica as the dominant species. Observed causes include overgrazing, suppression of wildfires, the reduction of rain as well as the introduction of bush seeds through smallstock. Older studies had suggested that an increase in bush cover by 10% reduces grazing by 7%, and grazing is eliminated by 90% bush cover. Also Euclea divinorum is a dominant encroaching species. Among others, woody encroachment threatens the habitat of plains zebras. Adaptation strategies include the integration of browsers into the livestock mix, for example goats and camels. In areas where Acacia mellifera encroaches, manual bush thinning during the late dry season combined with reseeding of native grasses and soil conservation measures, proved to be an effective restoration measure with 34% improvement in perennial grass cover. In the Baringo County of Kenya, up to 30% of grasslands have disappeared due to the invasion of Prosopis juliflora. Clearing Prosopis juliflora to restore grasslands can increase soil organic carbon and generate value through carbon credit schemes.

==== Tanzania ====
In Tanzania woody encroachment has been studied in the savanna ecosystem of the Maswa Game Reserve, with detected shrub growth rates of up to 2.6% per annum. Vachellia drepanolobium is the dominant species. Moreover, observed increases of shrubland in the Serengeti Plains are attributed to woody plant encroachment. Studies indicate that intensive cattle ranching is a cause of woody encroachment, for example with Vachellia zanzibarica. In Mwanga district, woody plant cover has increased significantly due to overgrazing. Fire management was studied as mitigation and management tool for woody encroachment in Tanzania.

==== Uganda ====
Bush encroachment in Uganda is found to have negative impacts on livestock farming. In selected study areas farm income was twice as high on farms that implemented bush control, compared to farms with high bush densities. Woody encroachment affects the savanna adjacent to the Kagera River. A continent-wide analysis of satellite imagery found that woody cover in sub-Saharan Africa increased by 8% over three decades, with Uganda among the four countries showing a mean fractional increase of more than 30%.

=== West African Guinean and Sudanian savannas ===
Map of the Guinean forest-savanna mosaic ecoregion

Bush encroachment is observed across several West African countries, especially in the Guinean savanna and the Sudanian savanna.

==== Burkina Faso ====
In Burkina Faso, woody plant encroachment threatens savannas. Particularly the livestock sector is negatively affected. Among the methods used to control bush densities are manual bush removal and prescribed fires. Fire exclusion is identified as a driver of woody encroachment.

==== Ivory Coast ====
In Ivory Coast late dry season fires were found to reduce bush encroachment in the Guinean savanna. Fire exclusion is found to be a driver of woody encroachment.

==== Ghana ====
In Ghana, woody encroachment is linked to fire exclusion.

==== Cameroon ====
In Cameroon, among the regions affected by bush encroachment is Adamawa Region, near the Nigerian border. It has been labelled "pastoral thickets" due to the suspected relation to livestock grazing pressure. Cameroon is among the four African countries for which a continent-wide satellite analysis found a mean fractional increase in woody cover of more than 30% over three decades. Further, there is significant evidence of woody encroachment in wetter areas of the country, in particular the forest-savanna transition region in the centre of the country south of Tibati. This has been documented in the Mbam Djerem National Park, and is visible in other woody savanna areas, though loss of forests due to extensive deforestation dominates in areas with denser population.

==== Central African Republic ====
In the 1960s pastoral land in the Central African Republic was mapped and bush encroachment attributed to livestock pressure as well as reduced fire intensity. The country is among the four in Africa with a mean fractional increase in woody cover of more than 30% over three decades.

=== Sahel ===
==== Senegal ====
In the pastoral areas of the Senegalese Sahel, woody cover increased by an average of 4% between 2000 and 2013, mainly through the growth of Combretaceae and Balanites aegyptiaca in forest reserves and areas with low population density and sufficient rainfall, while the drought years 2014–2015 caused a die-off of Guiera senegalensis across most of the study area.

=== Southern African Savanna ===
==== Angola ====
Between 1990 and 2020, open grassy vegetation declined by 62% in the Angolan miombo woodlands, and around 34% experienced significant woody encroachment.

==== Namibia ====
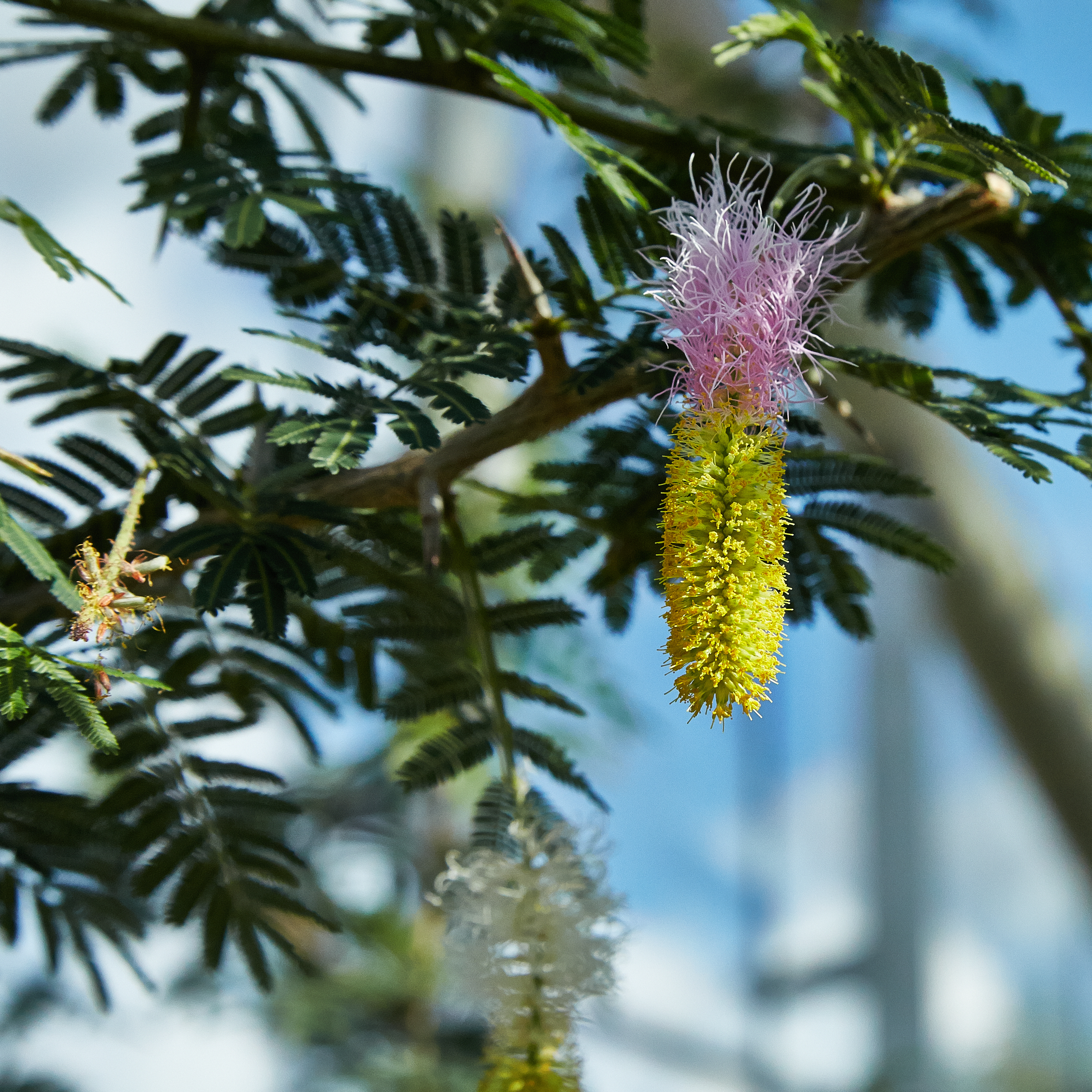
Dichrostachys cinerea, a common encroacher species in Namibia

Woody plant encroachment, locally called bush encroachment, is estimated to affect more than 45 million hectares of savanna and woodland in Namibia. As a result, agricultural productivity in Namibia has declined by two-thirds throughout the past decades. The phenomenon affects both commercial and communal farming in Namibia, mostly the central, eastern and north-eastern regions. Woody encroachment is more prevalent under intense grazing by cattle compared to intense grazing by wild herbivores. Also in national parks that feature a mixed land use of cattle herding and wildlife, bush encroachment has been observed. In the Bwabwata National Park, a long-term data analysis for the period 1996-2019 has revealed biodiversity losses due to woody encroachment. Common encroacher species include Dichrostachys cinerea, which is most dominant in areas with higher precipitation. As a result of woody encroachment, Namibia has the highest share of trees outside classified forests among all African countries. The probability of continued woody encroachment increases due to climate change. The government of Namibia has recognised bush encroachment as a key challenge for the national economy and food safety. In its Fifth National Development Plan (NDP5), it stipulates that bush shall be thinned on 82,200 hectares per annum. At the same time, the reduction of woody encroachment on 1.9 million hectares until 2040 is one of Namibia's primary Land Degradation Neutrality Targets under the UNCCD framework. The Government of Namibia pursues a value addition strategy, promoting the sustainable use of bush biomass, which in turn is expected to finance bush harvesting operations and therefore act as an economic incentive. As a result, the encroaching bush is increasingly seen as a valuable resource for commercial utilisation. A national study on the economics of land degradation in 2015 placed the aggregated potential net benefit of bush control and biomass utilisation over 25 years at N$48 billion (USD 3.25 billion). Existing value chains include wood briquettes for household use, woodchips for thermal and electrical energy generation (currently used at Ohorongo Cement, Namibia Breweries Limited), export charcoal, biochar as soil enhancer and animal feed supplement, bush-based animal feed, flooring and decking material, wood carvings, firewood and construction material, i.e. wood composite material and fibreboards. Further explored uses include bush biomass as a sustainable carbon carrier, for example for synthetic fuels.

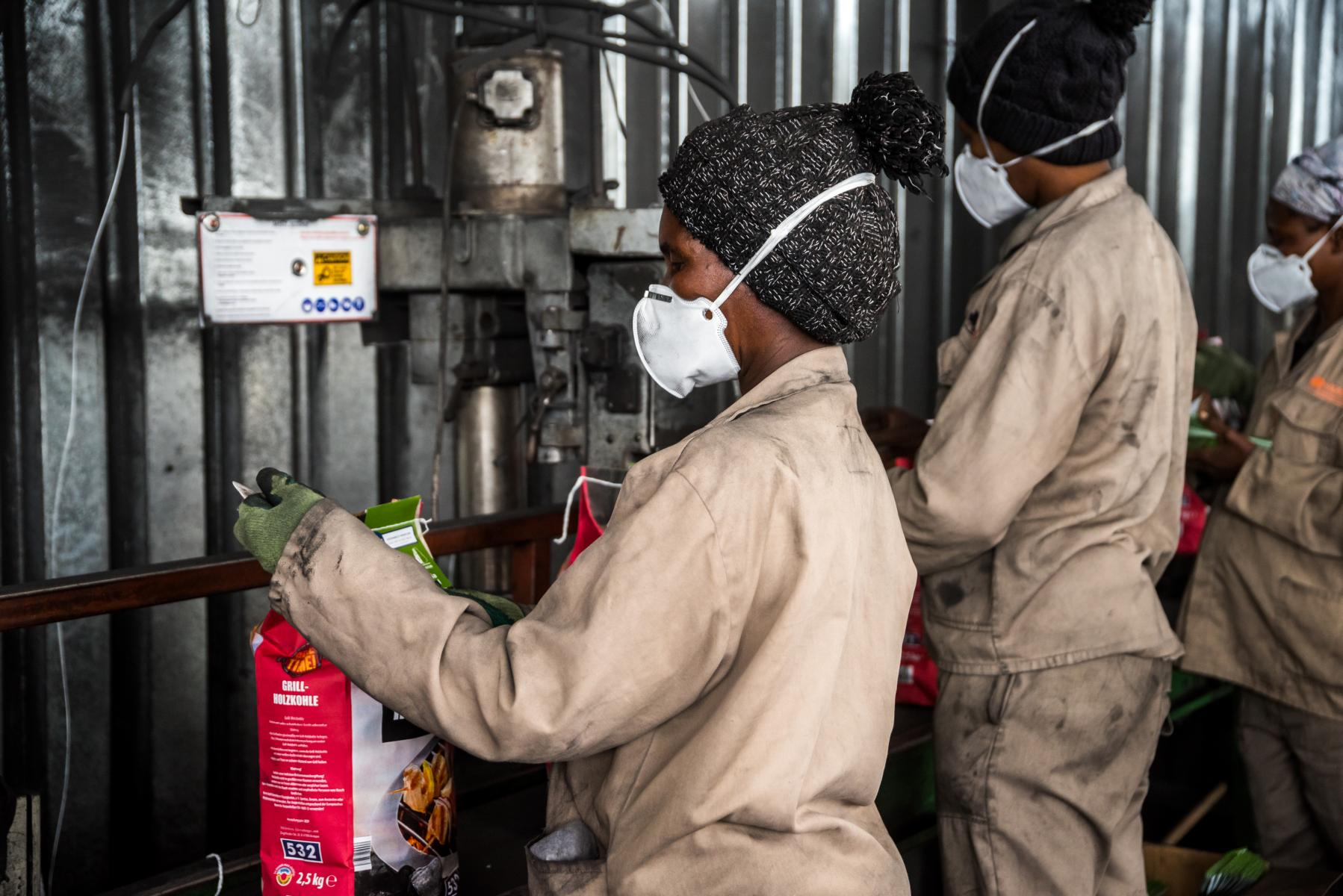
Women packaging charcoal produced in Namibia from encroaching woody species

Namibia has a well-established charcoal sector, which currently comprises approximately 1,500 producers and 12,000 workers. As per national forestry regulations, charcoal can only be produced from encroaching species. Voluntary certification through the Forest Stewardship Council has sharply increased in recent years, due to respective demand in many off-take countries, such as the United Kingdom, France and Germany. Due to exclusive use of encroacher bush for charcoal production, rendering the value chain free from deforestation, Namibian charcoal has been dubbed the "greenest charcoal" in an international comparison. Effective April 2020 the Forest Stewardship Council introduced a national Namibian FSC standard (National Forest Stewardship Standard) that is closely aligned to the global FSC certification standard, but takes into consideration context specific parameters, such as bush encroachment. In early 2020, the total land area certified under the FSC standard for the purpose of bush thinning and biomass processing was reported to amount to 1.6 million hectares. In 2016, the Namibia Charcoal Association emerged as a legal entity through a restructuring process of the Namibia Charcoal Producers Association, previously attached to Namibia Agricultural Union. The association was renamed the Charcoal Association of Namibia in 2023 (CAoN). It is a non-profit entity and the official industry representation, currently representing an estimated two-thirds of all charcoal producers in the country. Namibia Biomass Industry Group (N-BiG) is a non-profit association under Section 21 of the Companies Act (Act 28 of 2004) of Namibia, founded in 2016. It functions as the umbrella representative body of the emerging bush-based biomass sector in the country with voluntary paid membership. The core objectives, as enlisted in the Articles of Association, include to develop market opportunities for biomass from harvested encroacher bush as well as to address industry bottlenecks, such as skills shortages and research and development needs. The De-bushing Advisory Service is a division of the association, mandated with the dissemination of knowledge on the topics of bush encroachment, bush control and biomass use. Services are provided upon inquiry and are considered a public service and therefore not charged. Research in Namibia has shown that Soil Organic Carbon is a key rangeland health indicator that can be positively correlated both with woody plants and with systematic shrub thinning and controlled grazing.

==== Botswana ====
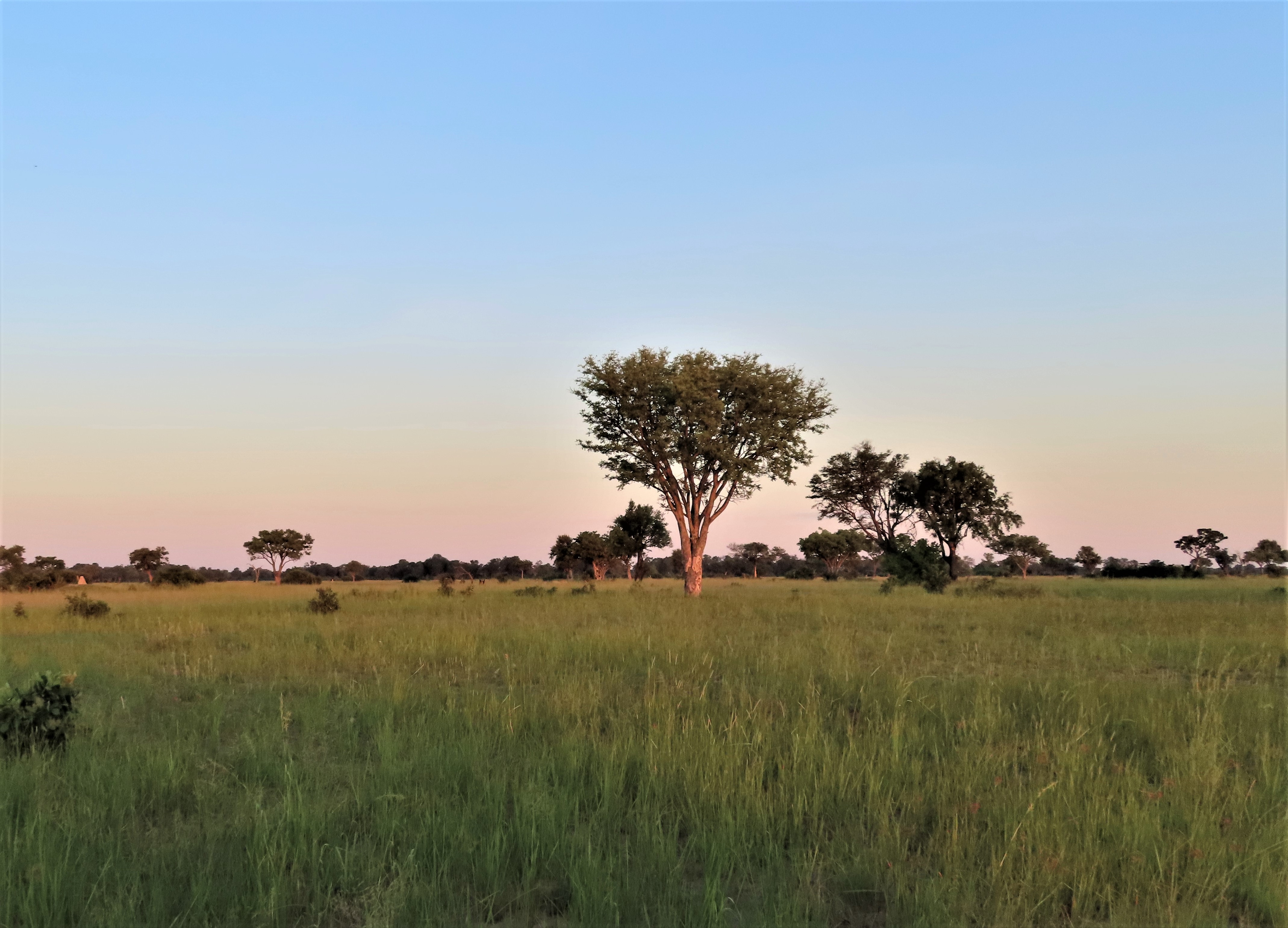
Healthy savanna landscape in Botswana

Bush encroachment in Botswana has been documented from as far back as 1971. Around 3.7 million hectares of land in Botswana is affected by bush encroachment, that is over 6% of the total land area. Encroaching species include Acacia tortilis, Acacia erubescens, Acacia mellifera, Dichrostachys cinerea, Grewia flava, and Terminalia sericea. Ecological surveys found bush encroachment affecting both communal grazing areas and private farmland, with particular prevalence in semi-arid ecosystems. Encroachment is considered a key form of land degradation, mainly because of the country's significant dependence on agricultural productivity. In selected areas, charcoal production has been introduced as a measure to reduce bush densities.

==== South Africa ====
In South Africa, bush encroachment refers to the increase of indigenous woody vegetation in the grassland and savanna biomes. These biomes make up 27.9% and 32.5% of the land surface area. About 7.3 million hectares are directly affected by bush encroachment, impacting rural communities socio-economically. Common encroaching species include Vachellia karroo, Senegalia mellifera, Dichrostachys cinerea, Rhus undulata and Rhigozum trichotomum. Encroaching species are less diverse in high-altitude rangelands and commonly dominated by Leucosidea sericea. The encroaching species Seriphium plumosum is locally referred to as "bankrupt bush" due to associated rangeland productivity losses of up to 80%. Encroachment is associated with a significant decline in grass species richness. The South African Government addresses woody plant encroachment in the Conservation of Agricultural Resources Act of 1983, defining indicators of bush encroachment. Through the public works and conservation programme Working for Water, the government of South Africa allocated approximately US$100 million per annum for the management of native encroaching species. The South African Water Research Commission has identified active rehabilitation of bush encroached areas as a priority to secure hydrological ecosystem services. As part of its national Land Degradation Neutrality targets, South Africa aims to restore 633 702 hectares of land affected by woody encroachment. Land users in South Africa commonly combat woody encroachment through clear felling, burning, intensive browsing or chemical control in the form of herbicide application. Woody encroachment is commonly perceived as negative by land users in affected areas. Studies have found a positive effect of bush thinning on grass biomass production over short periods of time. Studies on the efficacy of controlled fires to combat woody encroachment are ongoing, among others in the Kruger National Park. This research has shown that high-intensity fires may reduce woody encroachment in the short-term, but not in the mid-term. The Kruger National Park is largely affected by bush encroachment, which highlights that global drivers cause encroachment also outside typical rangeland settings. The presence of large wildlife like elephants is found to prevent woody encroachment at Kruger National Park, but at the same time presents a challenge for the persistence of big trees. There is evidence of woody encroachment in the Free State National Botanical Garden as well as the Marakele National Park. Also in communal areas, woody plant encroachment is a key catalyst of land degradation. A meta analysis of studies on the hydrological impact of woody encroachment finds that encroacher species can have a negative impact on groundwater recharge, although generally less so than alien invasive species. Research in the Kruger National park suggests that woody encroachment does not improve soil organic carbon, as the latter is predominantly grass-derived. A spatial assessment of tree cover and density across Kruger National Park between 2011 and 2022 similarly documented a decline of large trees and rapid shrub expansion, linked to abiotic factors such as fire, climate, soil and geology as well as to elephant density. Combining remote sensing, expert knowledge and field data has further been shown to accurately identify and prioritise emerging ecosystem shifts, including woody encroachment, in semi-arid savannas of the region.

==== Lesotho ====
In 1998, around 16% of Lesotho's rangelands were estimated to be affected by woody encroachment, linked to grazing pressure. Encroaching species include Leucosidea sericea and Chrysocoma and a negative impact on water catchment areas is suspected. The government of Lesotho has funded mechanical uprooting of shrubs in order to counter woody encroachment. This intervention was found to positively impact rangeland quality, which however declines over time as land re-encroaches.

==== Eswatini ====
Studies in the Lowveld savannas of Eswatini confirm heavy woody plant encroachment, especially by Dichrostachys cinerea, among other factors related to grazing pressure. In selected study areas the shrub encroachment increased from 2% in 1947 to 31% in 1990. In some affected areas, frequent fires, coupled with drought, reduced bush densities over time.

==== Mozambique ====
Gorongosa National Park experiences a significant increase of woody cover, especially in the miombo woodland, Acacia–Combretum–palm savanna, and floodplain grassland. This woody encroachment is linked to reduced browsing pressure, caused by a significant reduction of herbivores during the Mozambican Civil War.

==== Zambia ====
Woody encroachment has been recorded in southern Zambia. Between 1986 and 2010 woody cover increased from 26% to 45% in Kafue Flats and Lochinvar National Park. A common encroacher species is Dichrostachys cinerea.

==== Zimbabwe ====
There is evidence of woody plant encroachment in Zimbabwe, among others by Vachellia karroo. Documented observations of woody encroachment in Zimbabwe and its impact on land use date back to 1945. Encroaching species include Colophospermum mopane, Boscia corymbosa, Acacia rehmanniana, and Bauhinia petersiana.

=== Other ecoregions ===
==== Sudan ====
There is evidence of woody encroachment by Acacia laeta, Acacia mellifera, Acacia polyacantha, Acacia senegal and Vachellia seyal in Sudan.
