= Scythris falciformis =

Scientific classification
- Kingdom: Animalia
- Phylum: Arthropoda
- Clade: Pancrustacea
- Class: Insecta
- Order: Lepidoptera
- Family: Scythrididae
- Genus: Scythris
- Species: S. falciformis

Binomial name
- Scythris falciformis Bengtsson, 2014

Species of moth

Scythris falciformis is a moth of the family Scythrididae. It was described by Bengt Å. Bengtsson in 2014. It is found in Kenya.

The larvae have been recorded feeding on Acacia tortilis and Acacia mellifera.
