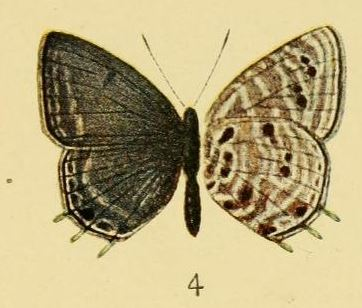

Scientific classification
- Kingdom: Animalia
- Phylum: Arthropoda
- Clade: Pancrustacea
- Class: Insecta
- Order: Lepidoptera
- Family: Lycaenidae
- Genus: Anthene
- Species: A. nigeriae

Binomial name
- Anthene nigeriae (Aurivillius, 1905)

Synonyms
- Lycaenesthes nigeriae Aurivillius, 1905; Anthene (Triclema) nigeriae; Triclema lydia Hulstaert, 1924; Anthene maesseni Stempffer, 1957

= Triclema nigeriae =

Species of butterfly

Triclema nigeriae, formerley Anthene nigeriae, the false hairtail or Nigerian ciliate blue, is a butterfly in the family Lycaenidae. It is found in the Gambia, Sierra Leone, Burkina Faso, Guinea, Ivory Coast, Ghana, Togo, Nigeria, the Democratic Republic of the Congo (Kabinda, Maniema and Lualaba), southern Sudan, Uganda, western Kenya, western Tanzania, Malawi, Zambia (the Copperbelt and eastwards) and eastern Zimbabwe. The habitat consists of forest margins, open areas in Guinea savanna and coastal scrub.

Adults are on wing in mid-summer.

The larvae feed on Acacia abyssinica, Acacia hockii and Dichrostachys species.

Torben Larsen developed a species numbering system for his 2005 publication Butterflies of West Africa. The nominate subspecies, then Anthene nigeriae, is #556. The 'Larsen' numbers have since been used with permission in A Sharp Eye on Butterflies of Ghana.
