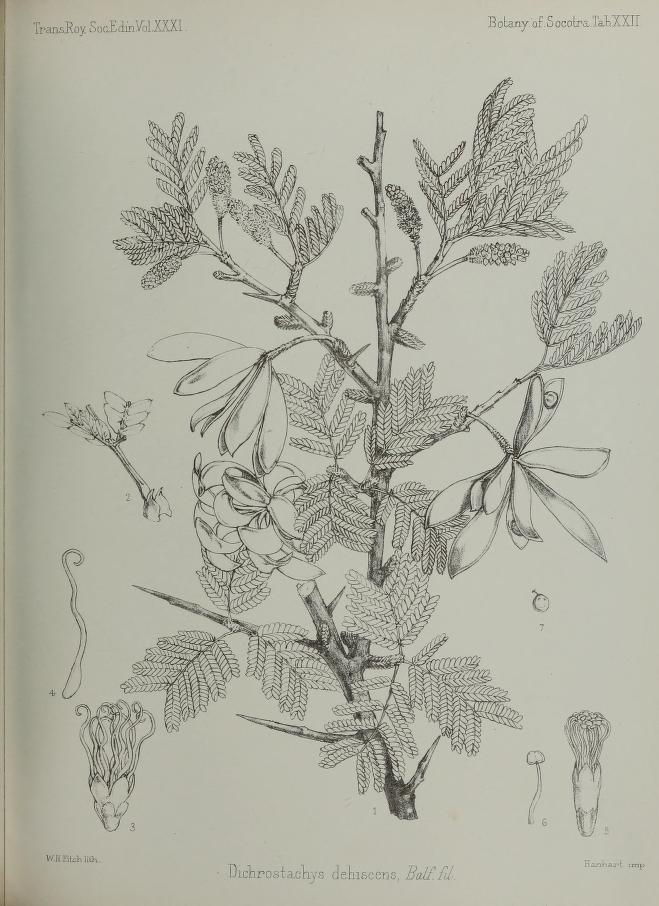

Conservation status
- Vulnerable (IUCN 3.1)

Scientific classification
- Kingdom: Plantae
- Clade: Tracheophytes
- Clade: Angiosperms
- Clade: Eudicots
- Clade: Rosids
- Order: Fabales
- Family: Fabaceae
- Subfamily: Caesalpinioideae
- Clade: Mimosoid clade
- Genus: Dichrostachys
- Species: D. dehiscens

Binomial name
- Dichrostachys dehiscens Balf.f.

= Dichrostachys dehiscens =

Species of plant

Dichrostachys dehiscens is a species of flowering plant in the family Fabaceae. It is endemic to north-central and central Socotra in Yemen. Its natural habitat is subtropical or tropical dry forests.
