= Dichrostachys kirkii =

Conservation status
- Near Threatened (IUCN 2.3)

Scientific classification
- Kingdom: Plantae
- Clade: Tracheophytes
- Clade: Angiosperms
- Clade: Eudicots
- Clade: Rosids
- Order: Fabales
- Family: Fabaceae
- Subfamily: Caesalpinioideae
- Clade: Mimosoid clade
- Genus: Dichrostachys
- Species: D. kirkii

Binomial name
- Dichrostachys kirkii Benth.

Species of legume

Dichrostachys kirkii is a species of flowering plant in the family Fabaceae. It is found in Ethiopia and Somalia.
