= Vachellia oerfota =

Conservation status
- Least Concern (IUCN 3.1)

Scientific classification
- Kingdom: Plantae
- Clade: Tracheophytes
- Clade: Angiosperms
- Clade: Eudicots
- Clade: Rosids
- Order: Fabales
- Family: Fabaceae
- Subfamily: Caesalpinioideae
- Clade: Mimosoid clade
- Genus: Vachellia
- Species: V. oerfota

Binomial name
- Vachellia oerfota (Forssk.) Kyal. & Boatwr.

Varieties
- Vachellia oerfota var. brevifolia (Boulos) Kyal. & Boatwr.; Vachellia oerfota var. oerfota
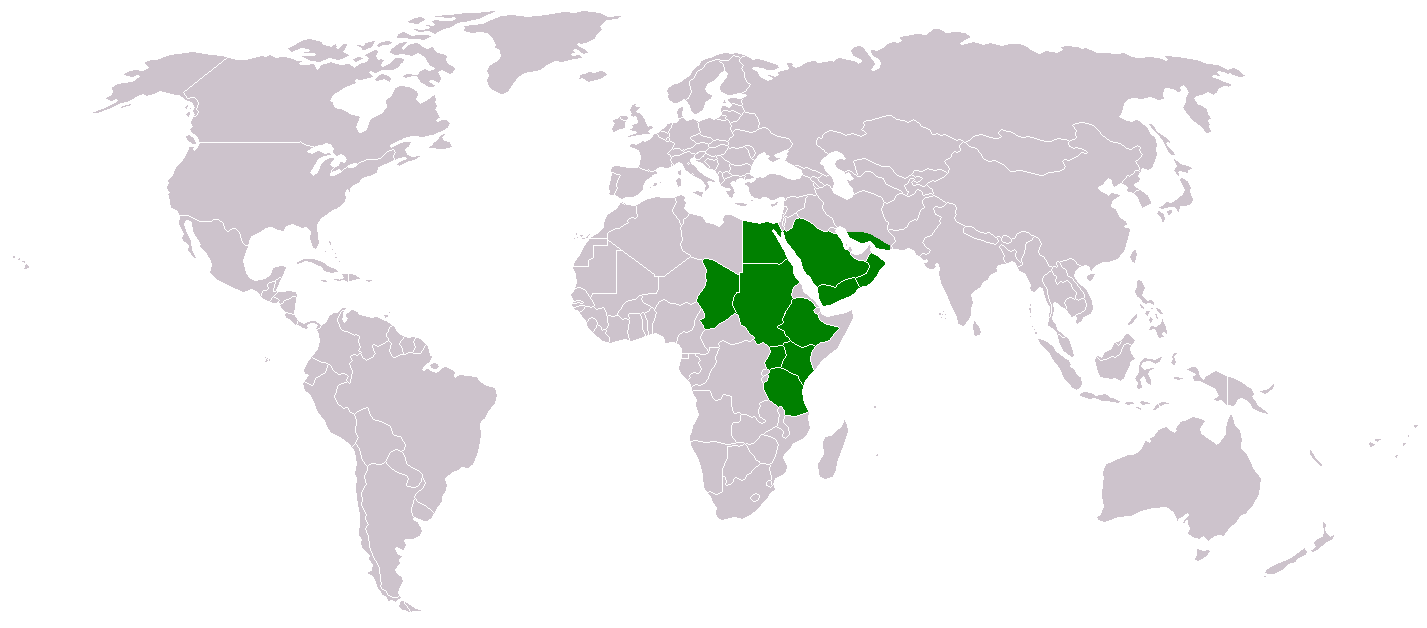
- Range of Vachellia oerfota

Synonyms
- Species synonyms: Acacia oerfota (Forssk.) Schweinf.; Mimosa oerfota Forssk.; Synonyms of var. brevifolia: Acacia sarcophylla Chiov.; Synonyms of var. oerfota: Acacia aucheri Benth.; Acacia gorinii Chiov.; Acacia merkeri Harms; Acacia nubica Benth.; Acacia nubica var. aethiopica Schweinf.; Acacia nubica var. erythraea Schweinf.; Acacia oerfota var. erythraea (Schweinf.) Fiori; Acacia oerfota var. nubica (Benth.) Fiori; Acacia pterygocarpa Hochst. ex Benth.; Acacia virchowiana Vatke & Hildebrandt; Vachellia nubica (Benth.) Kyal. & Boatwr.

Species of legume

Vachellia oerfota is a species of shrub or tree native to northeastern Africa, the Arabian Peninsula, and Iran.

== Botanical description ==
It is a somewhat obconical shrub which grows up to about 5 metres high. The branches often radiate from the base in all directions. The branchlets tend to be straight and are grey-white, with grey-white spines with brown tips, 0.5 to 1.5 cm long. The pinnae are in 3 to 12 pairs, with leaflets in 5 to 15 pairs, about 0.3 cm long. The flowers are off-white in globose heads, and are very fragrant Pods are 5 to 10 cm long, 1.25 cm broad and pale yellow, pointed at both ends. The seeds are olive-green, with five to ten in a pod. It has an offensive smell when bruised or cut.

== Distribution ==
Vachellia oerfota occurs mainly on alluvial silt soils. It is native to north-eastern Africa from Egypt to Chad and Tanzania, and to the Arabian Peninsula and Iran.

== Varieties ==
Two varieties are accepted.

- Vachellia oerfota var. brevifolia (Boulos) Kyal. & Boatwr. – Somalia, western Socotra Archipelago incl. incl. Abd al Kuri, Oman, Yemen, and Saudi Arabia
- Vachellia oerfota var. oerfota – northeastern Africa from Egypt to Chad and Tanzania, Socotra Archipelago, Arabian Peninsula (Oman, Saudi Arabia, and Yemen), and Iran

== Uses ==
It is an important legume tree commonly browsed by goats and camels in Africa. It is valued as a fodder by pastoralists. The leaves and pods are high in calcium, and the leaves are a good source of phosphorus.

The bark extract is said to have medicinal value amongst the Borana of Ethiopia, where it is boiled amongst other things for colds. Amongst the Samburu of Kenya is used for "women's stomach pain, hetpatitis, fever and gonorrhoea". It is used in making beverages. The bark is peeled, soaked in water and drunk as tea.
