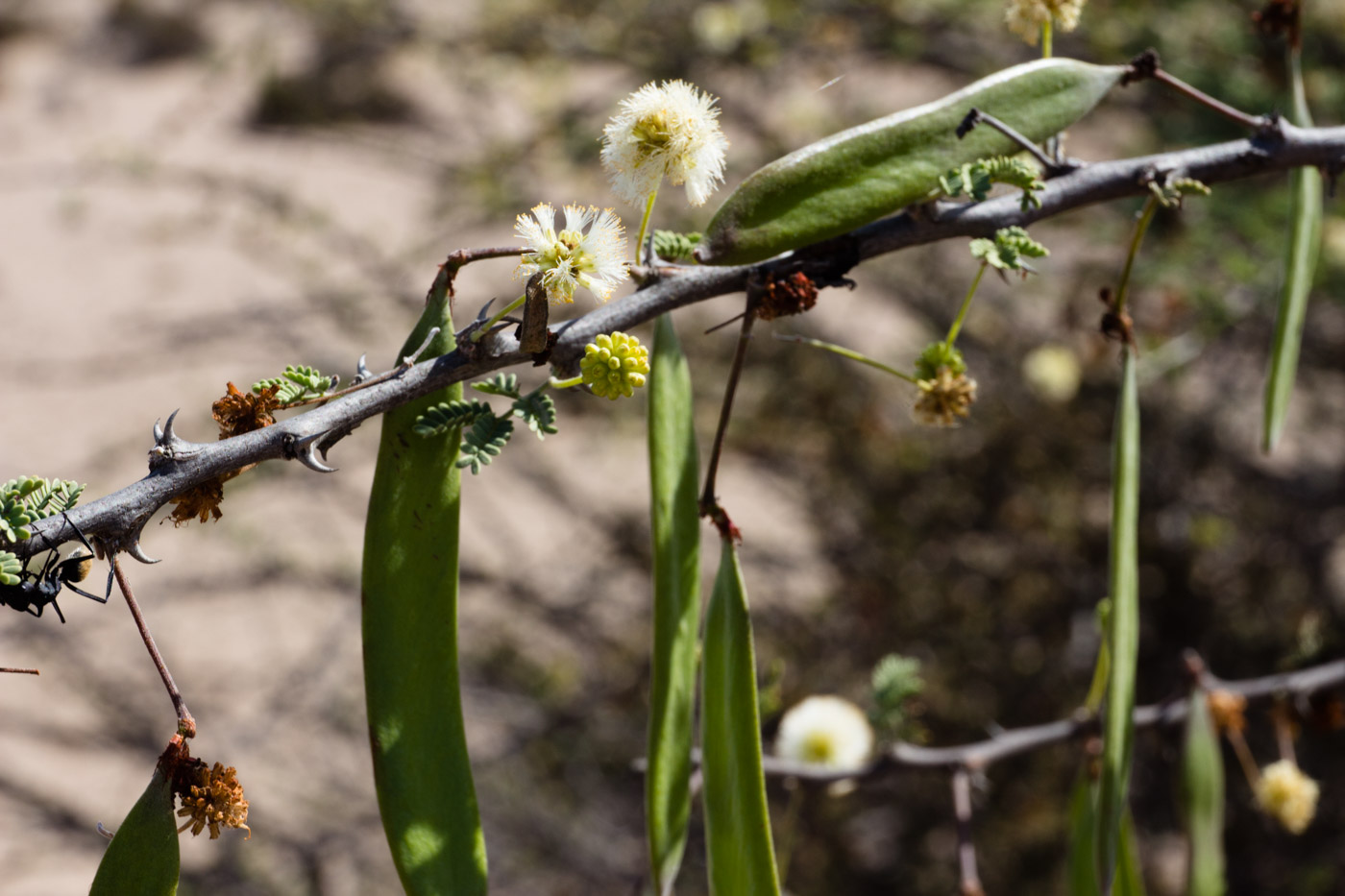

Conservation status
- Least Concern (IUCN 3.1)

Scientific classification
- Kingdom: Plantae
- Clade: Tracheophytes
- Clade: Angiosperms
- Clade: Eudicots
- Clade: Rosids
- Order: Fabales
- Family: Fabaceae
- Subfamily: Caesalpinioideae
- Clade: Mimosoid clade
- Genus: Vachellia
- Species: V. reficiens

Binomial name
- Vachellia reficiens (Wawra) Kyal. & Boatwr.

Subspecies
- Vachellia reficiens subsp. misera (Vatke) Kyal. & Boatwr.; Vachellia reficiens subsp. reficiens (Wawra) Kyal. & Boatwr.

Synonyms
- Acacia reficiens Wawra

= Vachellia reficiens =

Species of legume

Vachellia reficiens (Afrikaans: Rooihak, German: Rotrindenakazie), commonly known as red-bark acacia, red thorn, false umbrella tree, or false umbrella thorn, is a deciduous tree or shrub of the pea family (Fabaceae) native to southern Africa, often growing in an upside-down cone shape and with a relatively flat crown.

== Taxonomy ==
The Austrian naturalist Heinrich Wawra von Fernsee described Vachellia reficiens (as Acacia reficiens) in 1859. It forms a species complex with V. luederitzii, also from central and southern Africa. Two subspecies exist: V. reficiens subspecies reficiens, which found in Angola and southwestern Africa, and has affinities to V. luederitzii, and V. reficiens subsp. misera which is found in eastern Africa, from Sudan and Somalia through Kenya and into Uganda, and has affinities to V. etbaica. With the re-typification of the genus Acacia this species was placed in Vachellia.

== Description ==
Vachellia reficiens can grow up to 5 metres (16 ft) in height. Its bark is reddish-brown or greyish-black, and is quite rough and fissured. The younger growing branches can have a purple-red appearance, hence its common names. An interesting characteristic about this plant is that it has both, long, straight thorns and shorter curved/hook-like thorns, but generally not both in one pair. Leaves are bipinnately compound (as is common in most African acacia species) with 1 to 4 pinnae pairs, where each pinna again has 5 to 13 leaflet pairs. The flowers are white- to cream-coloured, and mostly seen during the summer months of December and January, but they can blossom almost all year round, depending on the geographical location. The fruit is a flat red-brown pod.

== Distribution and habitat ==
Vachellia reficiens is found in the drier areas of Africa, in the countries of Angola, Ethiopia, Kenya, Namibia, Somalia, Sudan and Uganda. This plant prefers rocky soil types and it does not grow in high rainfall areas, but rather in semidesert and arid shrubland.

It is an abundant dominant species of arid shrubland throughout Kenya, and it forms up to 30% of total woody canopy in the South Turkana Ecosystem in the Turkana District. In some savannas and woodlands Vachellia reficiens is a species of woody encroachment, crowding out herbaceous plants.

== Ecology ==
This tree's leaves are browsed upon by game and small livestock like the Greater Kudu and goats. In some areas of Namibia and Kenya, Vachellia reficiens subsp. reficiens is considered an encroaching species, as it can outcompete grass species on agricultural rangeland, especially on disturbed soil. It is very opportunistic and hardy and can subsequently take over large areas of native vegetation.

== Uses ==
The nomadic Ngisonyoka people in the Turkana District of Kenya use Vachellia reficiens wood to build temporary houses. In Namibia's Kaokoveld region, the branches of this tree are used for fencing and the bark is used to curdle milk, while the thorns can be used to pierce ears. The seeds can be baked in hot ash, crushed, ground and mixed with tobacco to use as snuff. The Giriama people use the wood for firewood and charcoal, and straight stems for poles.
