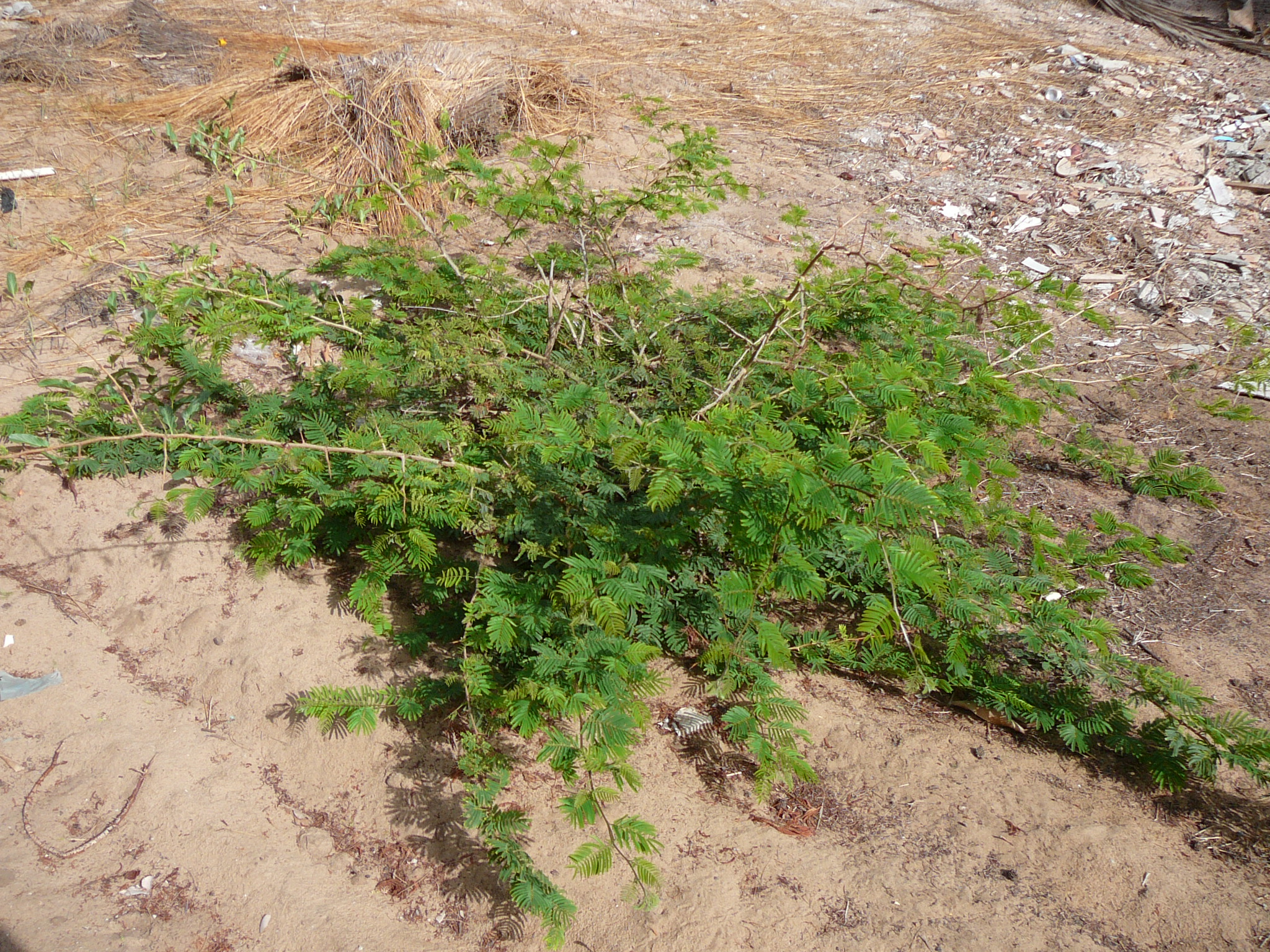
- Dichrostachys cinerea

Scientific classification
- Kingdom: Plantae
- Clade: Tracheophytes
- Clade: Angiosperms
- Clade: Eudicots
- Clade: Rosids
- Order: Fabales
- Family: Fabaceae
- Subfamily: Caesalpinioideae
- Clade: Mimosoid clade
- Genus: Dichrostachys (DC.) Wight & Arn. (1834)

Species
- 16; see text

Synonyms
- Cailliea Guill. & Perr. (1833)

= Dichrostachys =

Genus of legumes

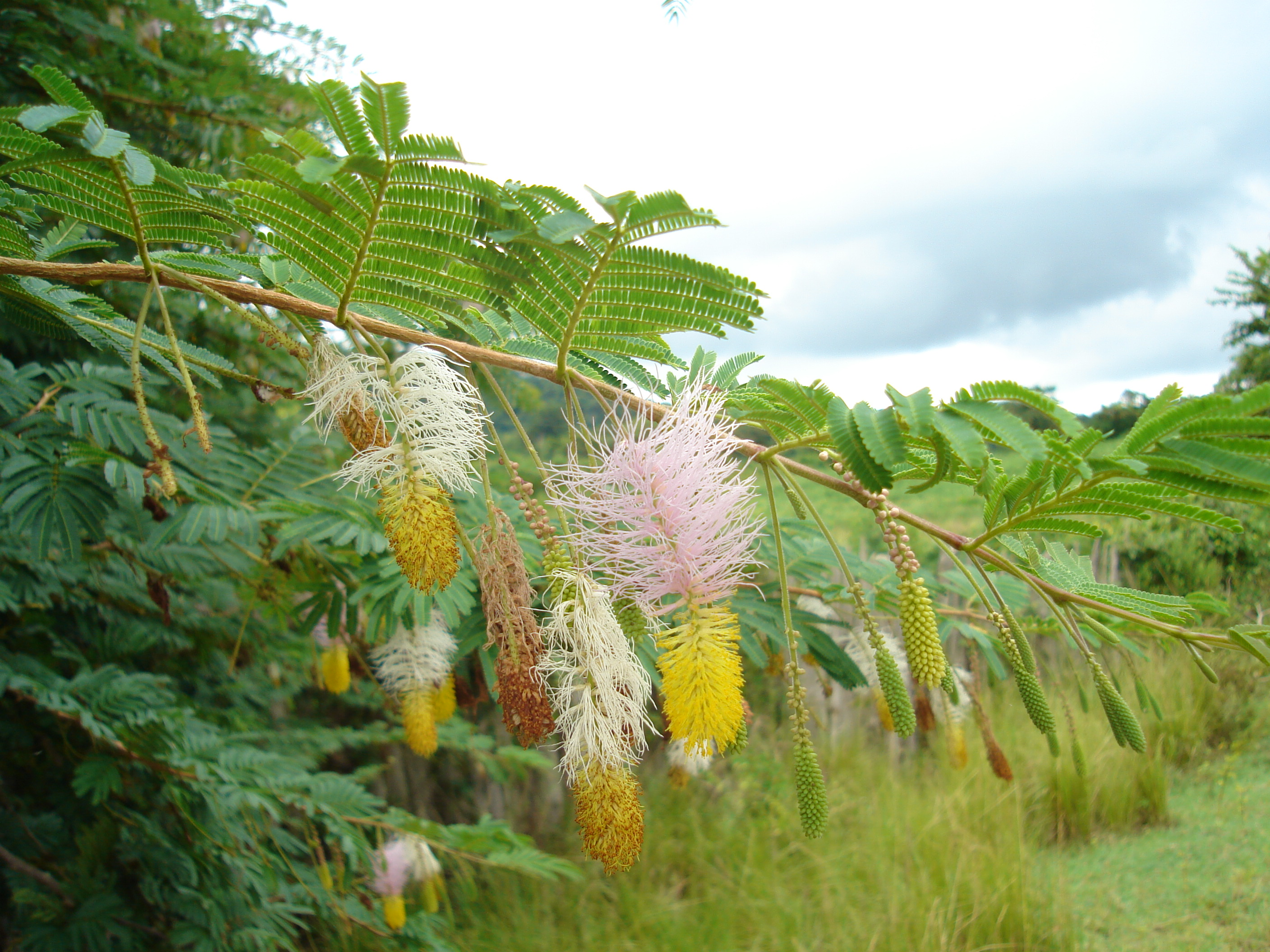
Dichrostachys cinerea in flower

Dichrostachys is an Old World genus of flowering plants in the family Fabaceae. Their Acacia-like leaves are bi-pinnately compound. Unlike Acacia their thorns are hardened branchlets rather than modified stipules. They are native from Africa to Australasia, but a centre of diversity is present in Madagascar.

Their name is derived from the Greek words dis (two), chroos (colour) and stachys (grain ear or spike), which in combination suggests their bi-colored inflorescences.

== Species ==
16 species are accepted:

- Dichrostachys akataensis Villiers
- Dichrostachys arborescens (Benth.) Villiers
- Dichrostachys bernieriana Baill.
- Dichrostachys cinerea (L.) Wight & Arn.
- Dichrostachys dehiscens Balf.f.
- Dichrostachys dumetaria Villiers
- Dichrostachys kirkii Benth.
- Dichrostachys myriophylla Baker
- Dichrostachys paucifoliolata (Scott-Elliot) Drake
- Dichrostachys pervilleana (Baill.) Drake
- Dichrostachys richardiana Baill.
- Dichrostachys scottiana (Drake) Villiers
- Dichrostachys spicata (F.Muell.) Domin
- Dichrostachys tenuifolia Benth.
- Dichrostachys unijuga Baker
- Dichrostachys venosa Villiers
