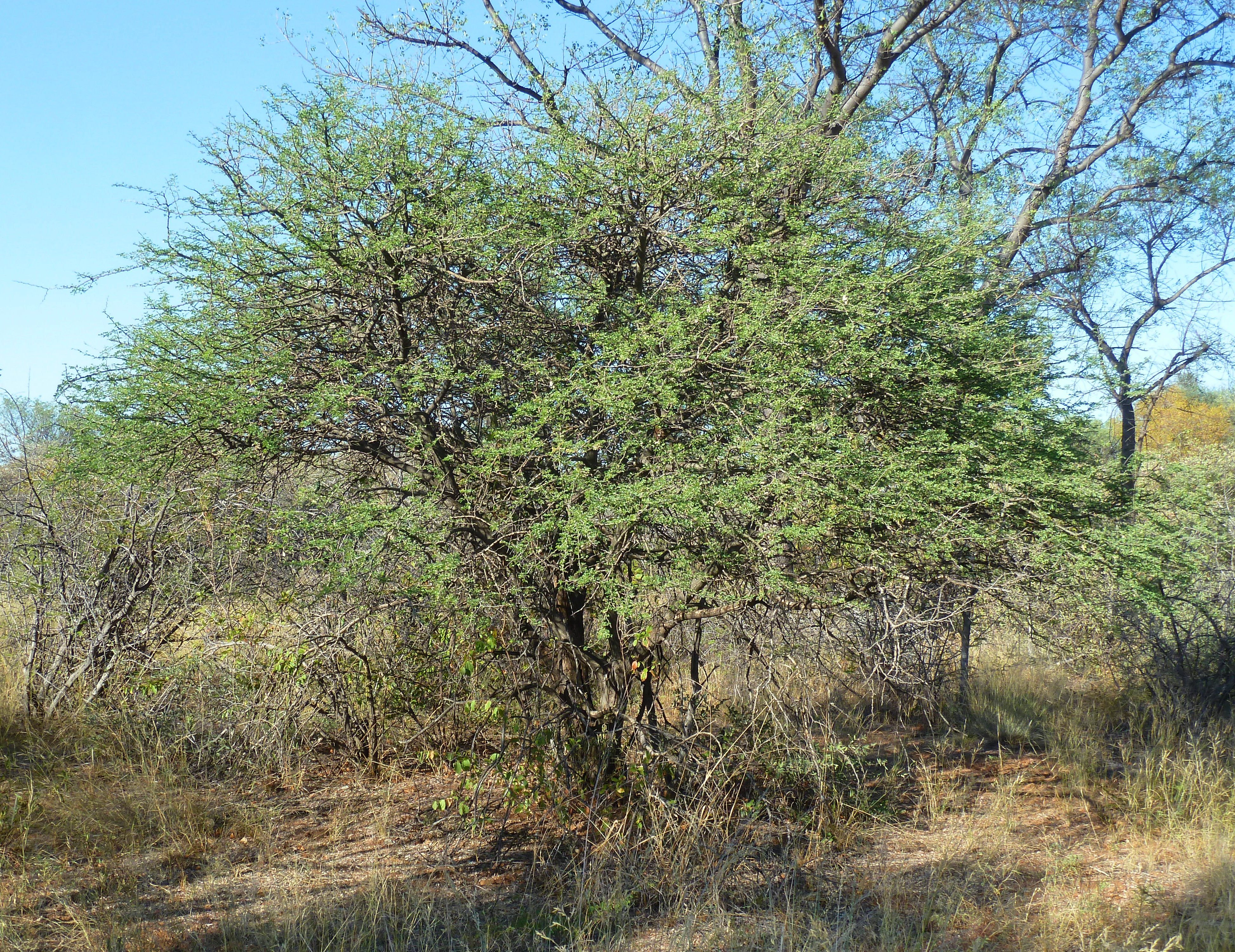

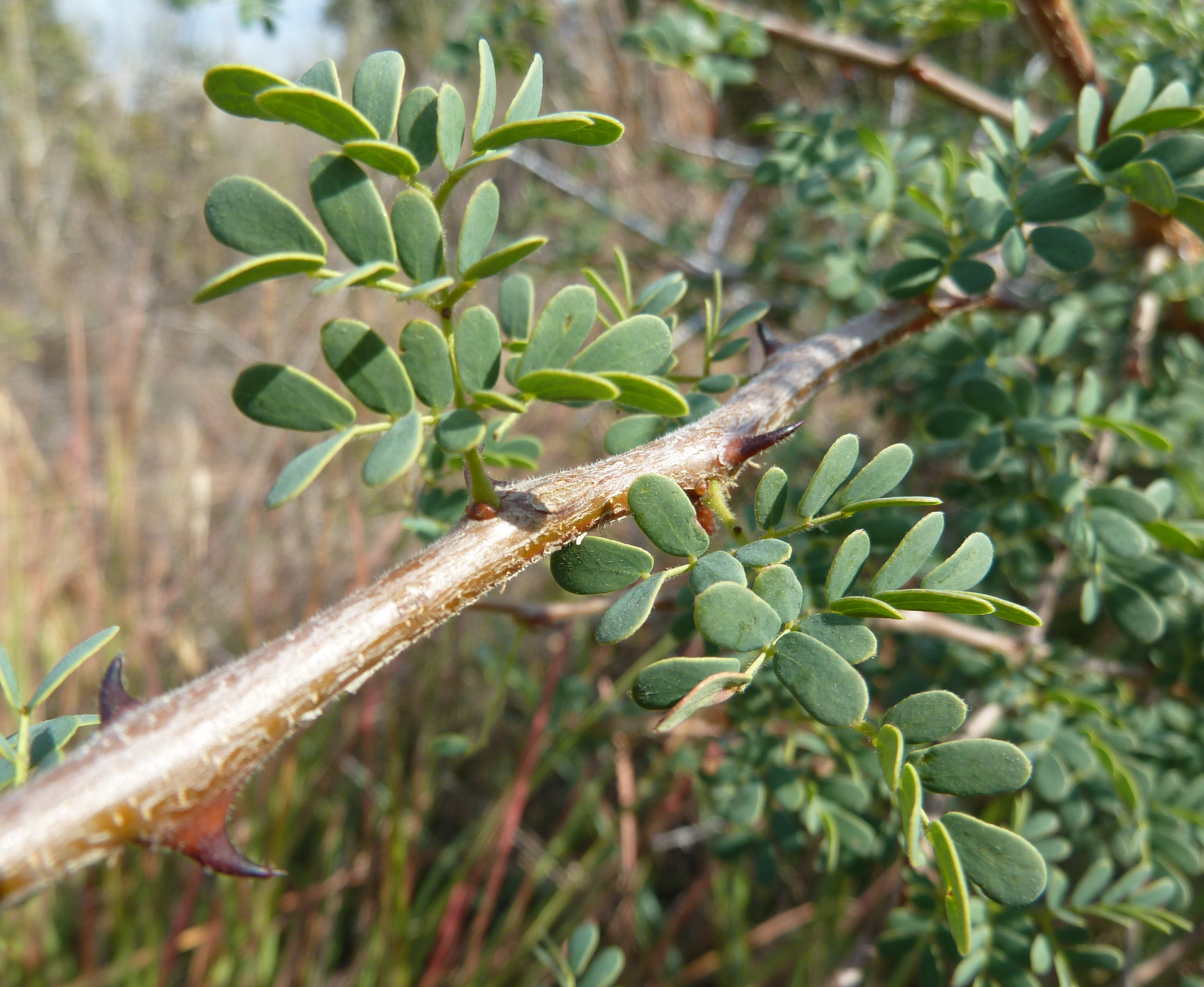

Scientific classification
- Kingdom: Plantae
- Clade: Embryophytes
- Clade: Tracheophytes
- Clade: Angiosperms
- Clade: Eudicots
- Clade: Rosids
- Order: Fabales
- Family: Fabaceae
- Subfamily: Caesalpinioideae
- Clade: Mimosoid clade
- Genus: Senegalia
- Species: S. mellifera

Binomial name
- Senegalia mellifera (M. Vahl) Seigler & Ebinger

Subspecies
- Senegalia mellifera subsp. detinens (Burch.) Kyal. & Boatwr.; Senegalia mellifera subsp. mellifera (M. Vahl) Seigler & Ebinger
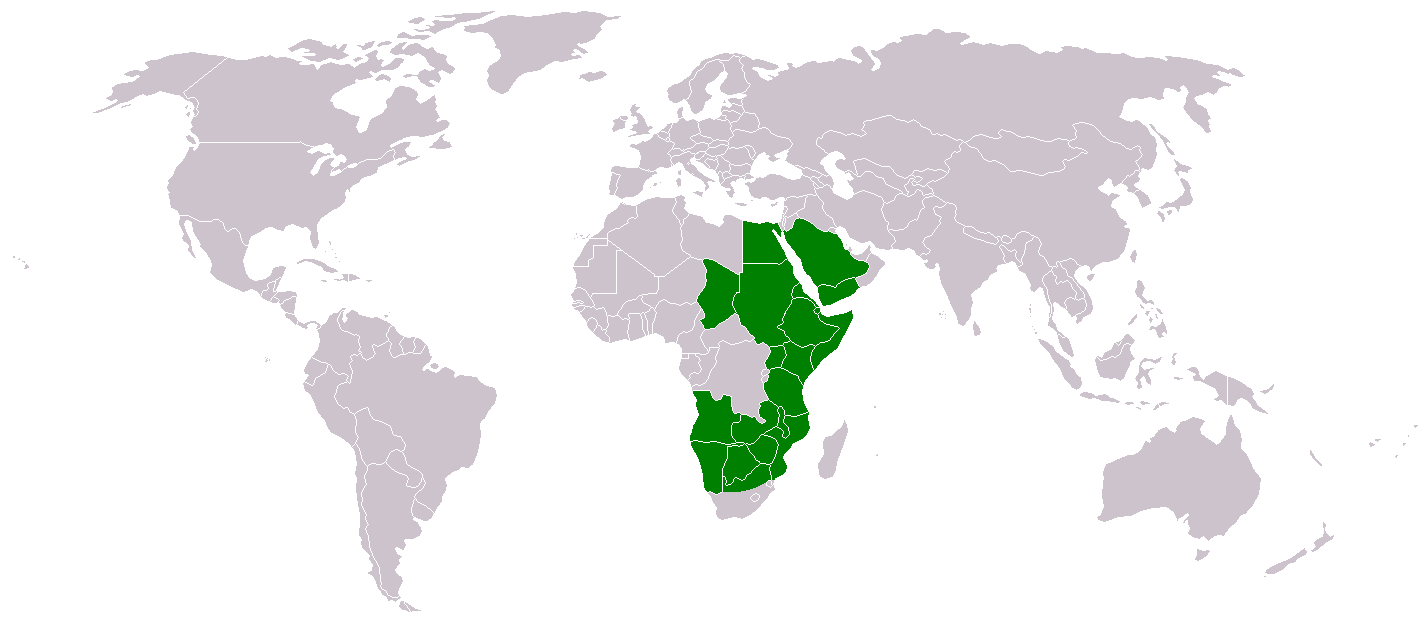
- Range of Senegalia mellifera

Synonyms
- Acacia mellifera (M. Vahl) Benth.; Mimosa mellifera M. Vahl

= Senegalia mellifera =

Blackthorn

Species of legume

Senegalia mellifera is a common thorn tree in Africa. The name mellifera refers to its sweet-smelling blossoms and honey. Its lumber turns pitch black when oiled. Common names of the tree include Blackthorn and Swarthaak (Afrikaans). It is listed as being not threatened.

== Distribution ==
Senegalia mellifera is found in the dry areas of Africa and the Arabian Peninsula.

== Characteristics ==
Senegalia mellifera can occur either as a multi-trunked bush up to seven metres high with more or less a funnel-shaped crown, or as a single-trunked tree that can reach a height of up to nine metres. It can form an impenetrable thickets. In some areas of Africa, it is considered a problematic shrub species leading to woody plant encroachment as it can expand into and cover large areas of farmland.

== Uses ==
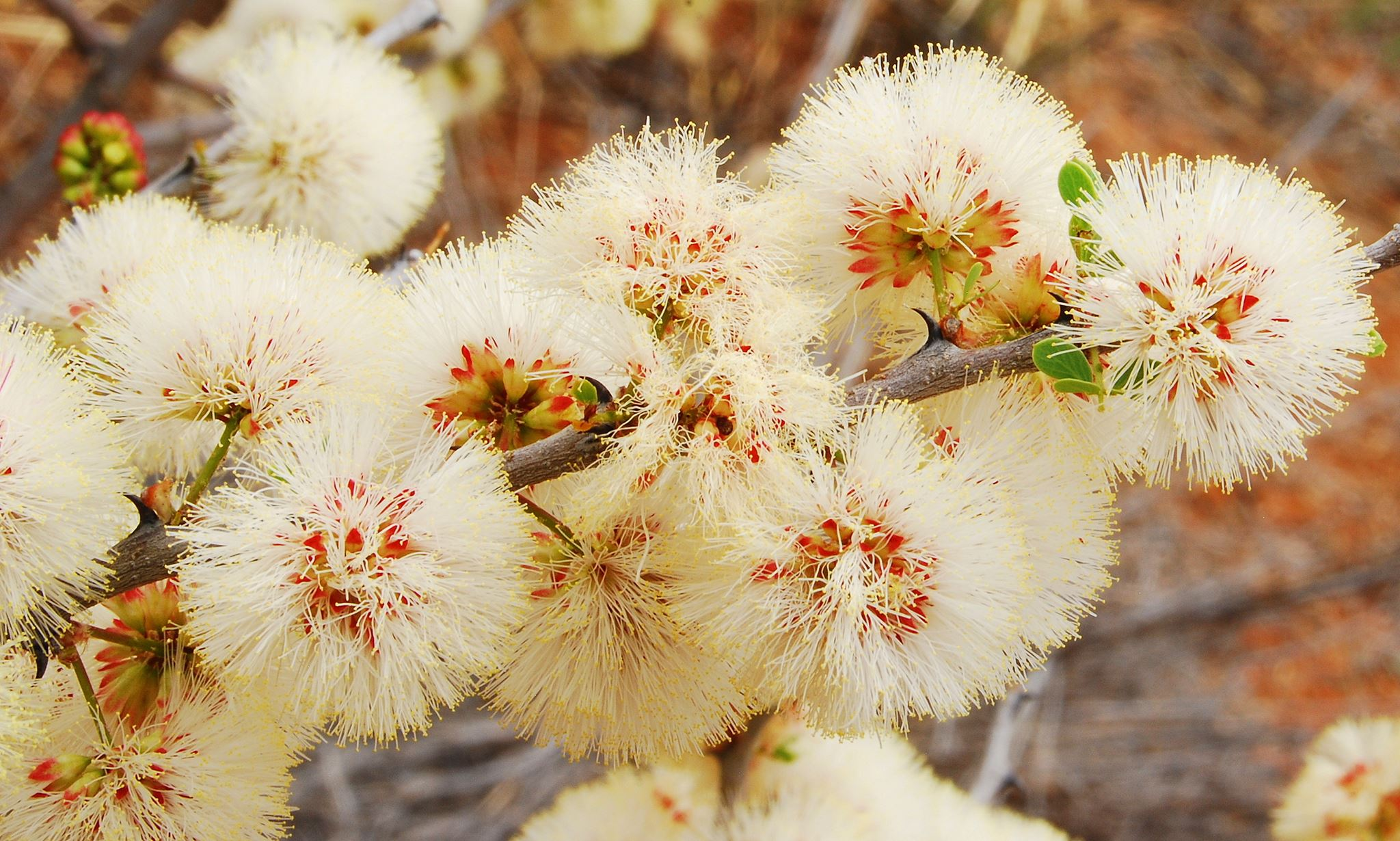
Inflorescences

In Africa, Senegalia mellifera is used as fencing, livestock feed and building material for huts. It flowers are sources of nectar for honey-producing bees. The wood is prized also for fuel and making charcoal. It is widely used in traditional African medicine.

== Animal uses ==
This tree is an important feed resource for both cattle and wild animals especially in dry areas of Africa. The leaves and young branches are very nutritious, containing a high percentage of protein. The flowers are often eaten by kudu. Common browsers of the tree include elephants, black rhino, giraffe and the eland. Senegalia mellifera leaves can constitute an important part of goat diets.
