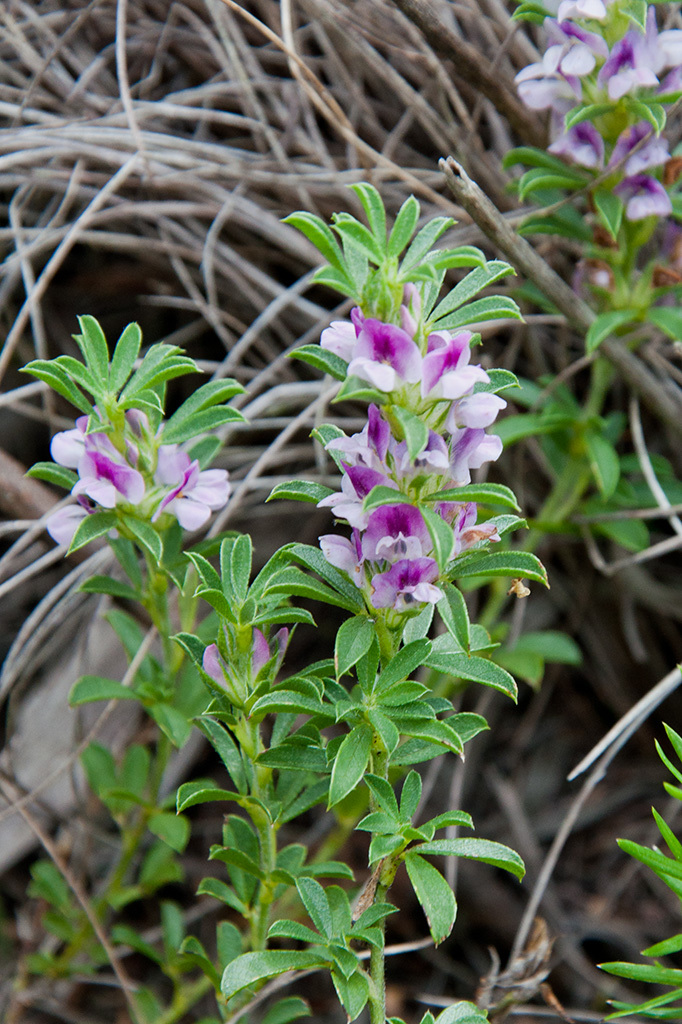
- Otholobium virgatum

Scientific classification
- Kingdom: Plantae
- Clade: Embryophytes
- Clade: Tracheophytes
- Clade: Spermatophytes
- Clade: Angiosperms
- Clade: Eudicots
- Clade: Rosids
- Order: Fabales
- Family: Fabaceae
- Subfamily: Faboideae
- Tribe: Psoraleeae
- Genus: Otholobium; C.H.Stirt.

Species
- See text.

= Otholobium =

Flowering plants in the pea family

Otholobium is a genus of flowering plants in the pea family with over 50 named species, but several also remain undescribed so far. Species may be herbaceous perennials, subshrubs, shrubs or small trees. The alternately set leaves are accompanied by stipules and mostly consist of three leaflets, sometimes just one. The inflorescences are on short or long stalks in the axils of the leaves. Within the inflorescences, the pea-like flowers occur in groups of three, rarely of two, subtended by a bract, and each individual flower also is subtended by a narrow bract. The petals may be white, pink, purple or blue, often with a differently colored nectar guide, that may sometimes even be yellow. The seedpods contain just one, black, dark or light brown seed. Most species are restricted to the Cape Provinces of South Africa, but some occur at higher elevations in eastern Africa. Charles Stirton erected the genus in 1981. Phylogenetic studies found that the South American species are distinct from the African species, and in 2024 Egan et al. described the new genus Grimolobium to contain the eight South American species.

== Description ==
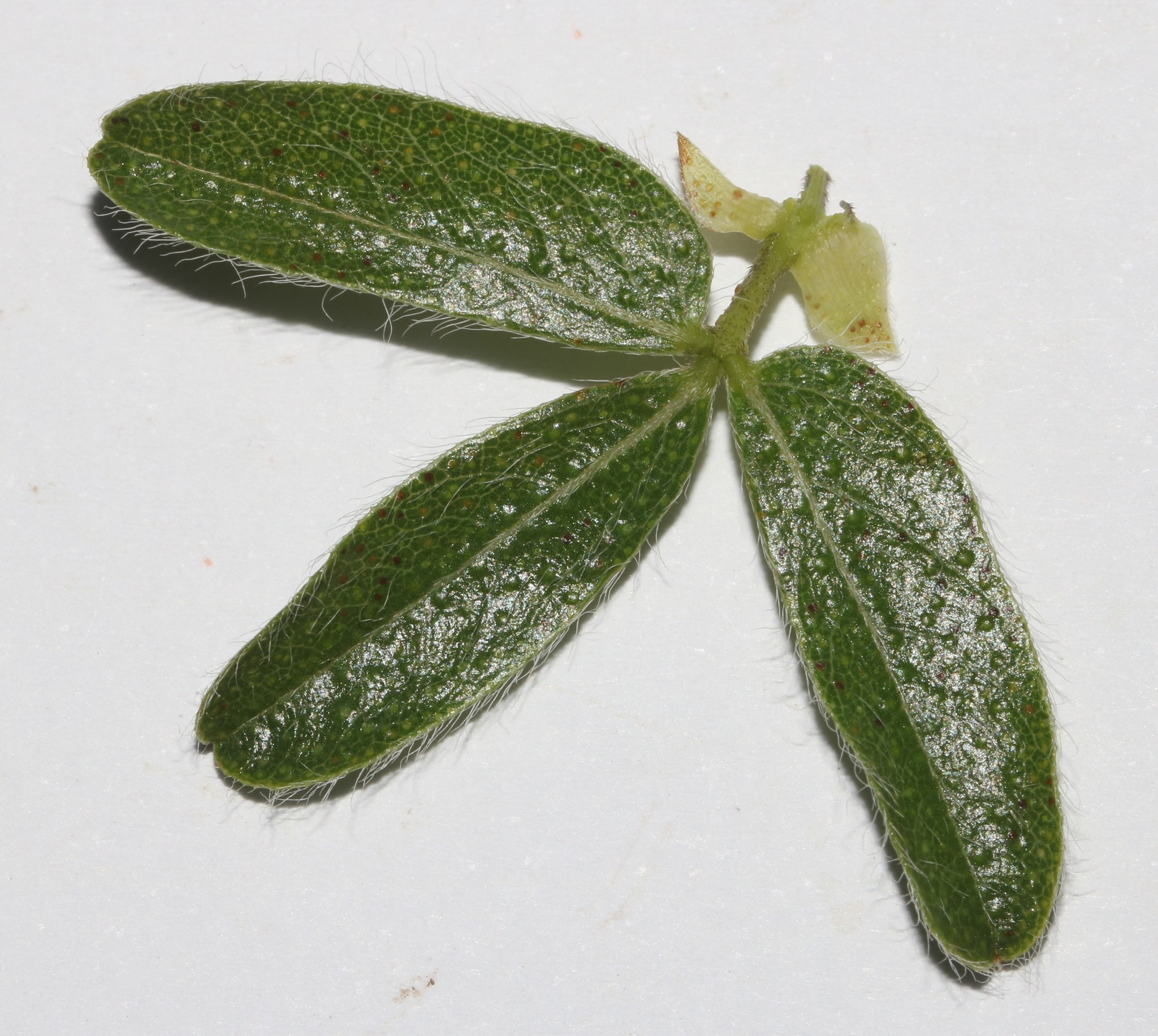
leaf with stipules and 3 entire leaflets in O. obliquum

As far as known, the species currently assigned to the genus Otholobium are diploids with 20 chromosomes (2n=20). They are shrubs, subshrubs or sometimes spreading herbs with alternately set leaves, each consisting of one or three entire leaflets carrying black or transparent glands, which have a wedge-shaped base and a pointed or blunt tip that is often hooked, with the main vein extended beyond the tip. Left and right of the base of the leafstalk, are two softly hairy stipules that may be partly merged with the stalk or entirely free, and are oval with a pointy tip or awl-shaped, while several veins create a striped appearance.

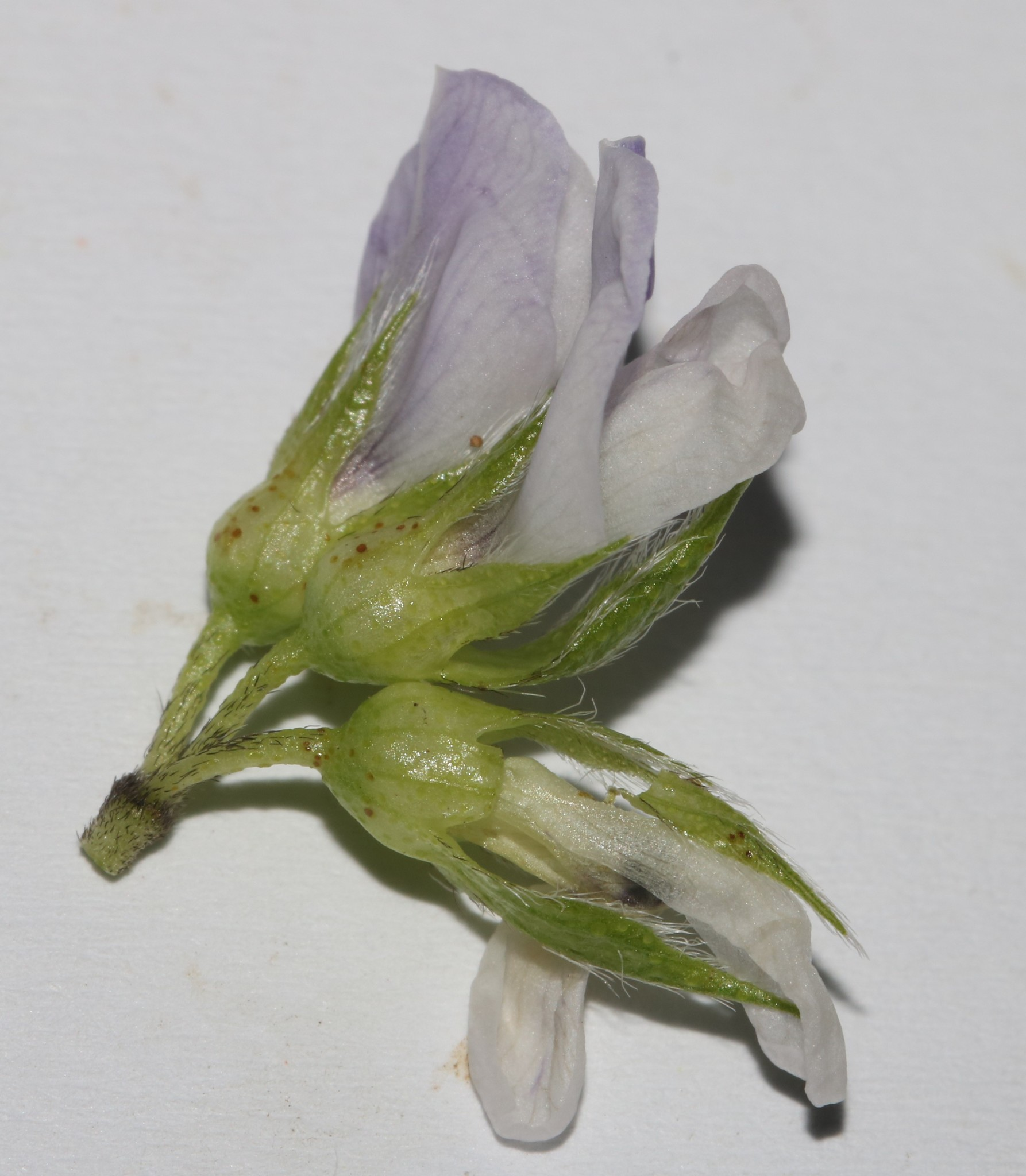
Flowers in a cluster of 3 in O. obliquum

The flowers are seated or on a very short stalk, growing in inflorescences consisting of 1 or 5-18 groups of 3 or rarely 2, set in the leaf axils or at the tip of the stems. Every individual flower is subtended by a bract and every triplet is subtended by an oval bract. The 5 sepals are merged at the base to form a bell-shaped calyx and 5 unequal lobes at the top. The lowest lobe may or may not be much longer or broader than the rest, while the upper 2 or 4 lobes may be merged further toward the tip. The inside of the calyx is sometimes covered in black, stubby hairs.

As in most Faboideae, the corolla is zygomorph, forms a specialized structure and consists of 5 free petals. These may be white, yellow or pale blue in color. The upper petal, called the banner or standard, is large and envelops the other petals in the bud. It is oblong or oval in shape, with weakly developed claw and auricles and no appendages. The 2 adjacent petals called wings have long claws, are tinged purple at the blunt tip, are adorned by ridges, and enclose the 2 bottom petals. The two bottom petals have long claws and are tinged purple at the blunt tip, are free at the base but fused together at their tip and they form a boat-like structure called the keel. In Otholobium, the keel is much shorter than the wings. The keel contains 10 identically shaped filaments, 9 are fused while 1 is partially free. The anthers are alternately fixed to their filament at the base and at midlength. The seated ovary is either covered in hairs or in glands and contains 1 ovule. It carries the swollen style that is topped by a pin-shaped stigma, without or with a brush of hairs. From it develops a swollen, softly hairy fruit that ends in a slight beak and protrudes from the calyx when ripe. The fruit does not open. The seeds are light brown to black in colour and longer than wide.

=== Differences with related genera ===
Otholobium differs from Psoralea and Hallio by the lack of a cupulum, a small, 2- or 3-lobed bract that encircles the peduncle between its base and the calyx. It differs from Cullen, which has a black glandular-warty fruit.

== Taxonomy ==
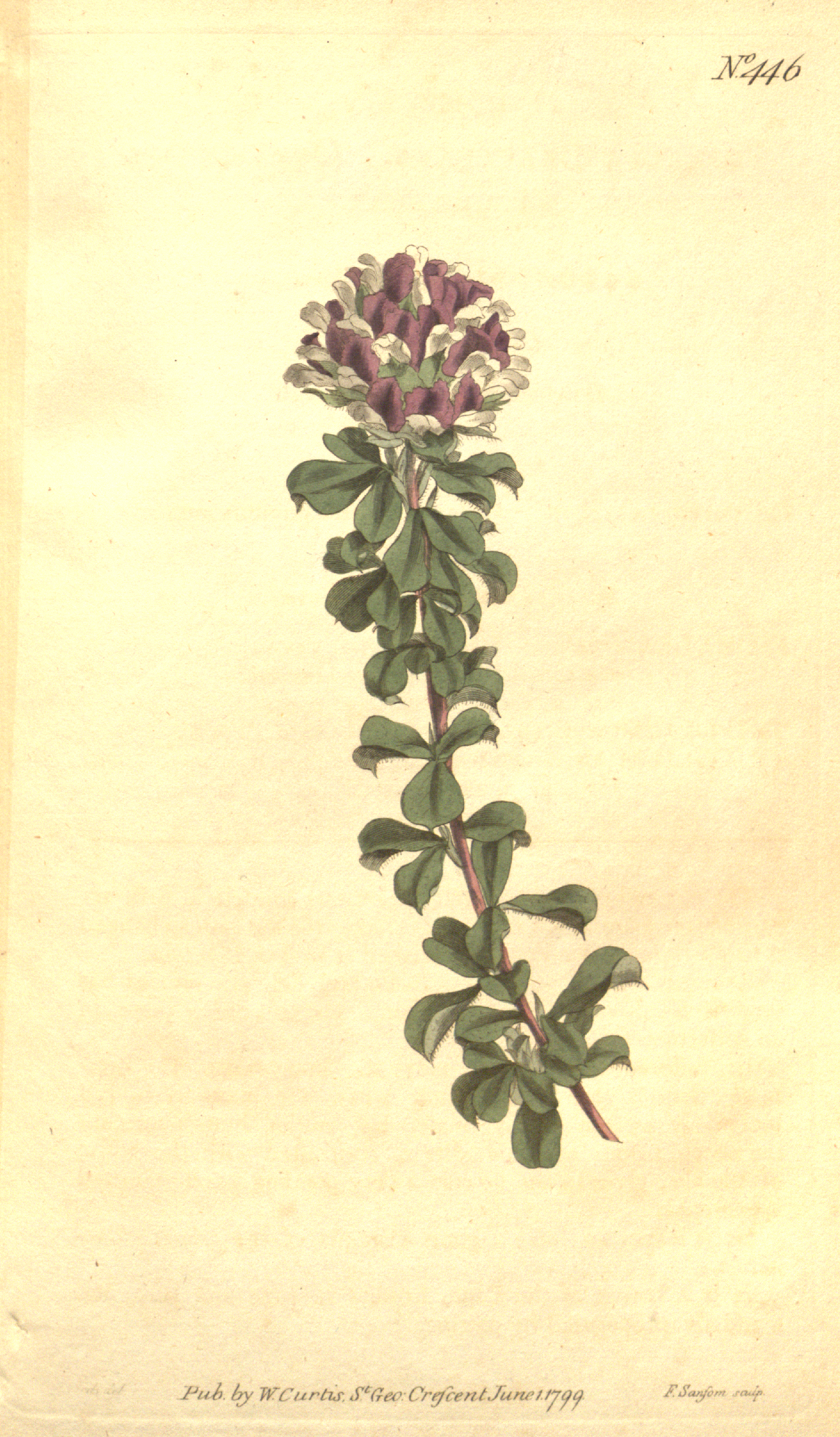
etching of Otholobium fruticans from Volume 13 of The Botanical Magazine, by William Curtis, published in 1799

Carl Linnaeus was the first to describe a species now assigned to this genus, and he called it Trifolium fruticans. It is now known as Otholobium fruticans. This name was published in the Species Plantarum in 1753, the first work to consistently apply binomial names. Two further species were described by Carl Linnaeus the Younger in 1781. He named them Psoralea rotundifolia and P. stachydis, and these species are now known as Otholobium rotundifolium and O. hirtum. This was followed in 1794 by Jean Louis Marie Poiret who added P. acuminata, P. ononoides and P. sericea, which are currently named O. acuminatum, O. virgatum and O. sericeum respectively. When Carl Thunberg, who visited the Cape from 1772 till 1775, revised Psoralea in 1823, and therein added P. tomentosa, P. racemosa, P. argentea and P. striata (now O. sericeum, O. racemosum, O. argenteum and O. striatum). Ernst Heinrich Friedrich Meyer described in 1832 Psoralea obliqua (now Otholobium obliquum), P. bracteata var. bracteata (now O. fruticans) and P. bracteata var. brevibracteata (the current O. bracteolatum). In 1836, Psoralea was reviewed by Christian Friedrich Ecklon and Karl Ludwig Philipp Zeyher, who distinguished P. albicans (= O. argenteum), P. algoensis and P. bracteolata (which are considered to be conspecific and are known today as O. bracteolatum), P. candicans (now O. candicans), P. cephalotes and P. stachyerum (both now included in O. stachyerum), P. hilaris (currently O. racemosum), P. polyphylla (now O. polyphyllum), P. rupicola (now included in O. striatum), P. uncinata (now O. uncinatum) and P. venusta (now O. venustum). In the same year Meyer published a revision in which he distinguished P. carnea, P. obliqua, P. parviflora, P. triantha (now known as O. carneum, O. obliquum, O. parviflorum and O. trianthum respectively), P. cephalotes (= O. stachyerum), P. densa (= O. acuminatum), and P. spathulata (= O. mundianum). In Volume II of the Flora Capensis, published in 1862, William Henry Harvey newly described P. bowieana, P. hamata, P. macradenia, P. polysticta and P. thomii (now O. bowieanum, O. hamatum, O. macradenium, O. polysticum, O. thomii). Daniel Oliver described Psoralea foliosa (= O. foliosum) in 1885, while Edmund Gilbert Baker distinguished P. foliosa var. gazense (= O. subsp. gazense) in 1911. Helena Forbes added in 1930 P. bolusii (= Otholobium bolusii) and P. royffei (included in O. afrum). Henry Georges Fourcade described P. heterosepalum (= O. heterosepalum) in 1932.

The genus Otholobium was erected in 1981 by the British/South African botanist Charles Stirton. He chose Psoralea afra as type species. He reassigned many species previously included in Psoralea to his new genus and described many new species since then: Otholobium pungens in 1981, O. rubicundum and O. pictum in 1982, O. swartbergense in 1986, O. accrescens, O. arborescens, O. dreweae, O. flexuosum, O. fumeum, O. incanum, O. lanceolatum, O. lucens, O. nigricans, O. nitens, O. prodiens, O. pustulatum, O. sabulosum, O. saxosum and O. spissum in 1989. He described O. fumeum and O. nigricans from Natal and Transvaal in 1990.

Also in 1990, James Grimes proposed to include eight species that occur in the Andes mountains: O. brachystachyum, O. glandulosum, O. higuerilla, O. holosericeum, O. munyense, O. pubescens (originally Psoralea brachystachya, P. glandulosa, P. higuerilla, P. holosericea, P. munyense and P. pubescens), O. mexicanum (Indigofera mexicana) and the new species O. diffidens. Probably, the Andean species should be removed from Otholobium. In 2024 Ashley N. Egan et al. published a detailed phylogenetic study of the South American species, and based on phylogenetic and morphological differences placed them in the new genus Grimolobium, which they named in honor of Grimes.

O. curtisiae was described in 2013 by Stirton together with A. Muthama Muasya. These two authors further described O. accrescens, O. dreweae, O. lanceolatum, O. lucens, O. nitens, O. piliferum, O. prodiens, O. sabulosum, and O. saxosum in 2017.

Plants of the World Online treats Otholobium as a synonym of Psoralea.

The name of the genus Otholobium is a combination of the Greek words ὠθέω (ōthéō) meaning to push and λοβός (lobos) meaning pod, which Stirton selected because its fruit seems to be pushed out of the calyx.

=== Phylogeny ===
Comparison of homologous DNA has increased the insight in the phylogenetic relationships. The following tree represents current insight in the relationship within the Psoraleeae.

- - Phaseoleae (outgroup)
  - Psoraleeae
    - - Otholobium(African species)
      - Psoralea
    - - Cullen
      - - Bituminaria
        - - Hoita
          - - - Otholobium(South American species)
              - Orbexilum
            - - - Ladeania
                - Rupertia
              - Pediomelum

== Distribution, habitat and ecology ==
Almost all species assigned to the genus Otholobium are limited to the Cape provinces of South Africa, but a few can be found outside South Africa along the continent’s east coast to Kenya. O. foliosum subsp. gazense occurs in the Chimanimani Mountains along the Zimbabwe-Mozambique border, and O. foliosum subsp. foliosum in the mountains of Malawi, Tanzania and Kenya. The genus is absent from Ethiopia and Madagascar. Like in many other plant genera, species density dramatically decreases to the east and north of the West Cape province. The species assigned to the genus by Grimes occur in the Andes from Chile in the south to Colombia and Venezuela in the north.

== Conservation ==
The conservation status of forty-eight species has been assessed for South Africa, one of which has two subspecies. One of those subspecies occurs in the mountains of eastern Africa but does not occur in South Africa. The survival of twenty-four taxa is considered to be of least concern: O. acuminatum, O. arborescens, O. bracteolatum, O. afrum, O. candicans, O. flexuosum, O. foliosum subsp. gazense, O. fumeum, O. hirtum, O. mundianum, O. nigricans, O. obliquum, O. parviflorum, O. pictum, O. polyphyllum, O. polystictum, O. sericeum, O. spicatum, O. stachyerum, O. striatum, O. trianthum, O. virgatum, O. wilmsii and O. zeyheri.

Four species are regarded as near threatened: O. accrescens, O. bolusii, O. spissum and O. swartbergense.

Seven species are rare: O. carneum, O. fruticans, O. heterosepalum, O. macradenium, O. nitens, O. pustulatum and O. racemosum.

Four species are regarded as vulnerable: O. dreweae, O. hamatum, O. lucens and O. rotundifolium.

Six have been categorised as endangered species: O. bowieanum, O. curtisiae, O. incanum, O. pungens, O. saxosum and O. thomii.

Two are thought to be critically endangered: O. lanceolatum and O. rubicundum.

Finally, three taxa have not been evaluated, O. argenteum because not enough information was available to determine its conservation status, O. prodiens because there is doubt about its status as a species and O. foliosum subsp. foliosum because it does not occur in South Africa.
