= C18H24O =

The molecular formula C_{18}H_{24}O (molar mass: 256.39 g/mol, exact mass: 256.1827 u) may refer to:

- Bakuchiol
- Drupanol
