= Leather root =

Leather root is a common name for several genera of legumes and may refer to:

- Hoita
- Orbexilum
- Psoralea
