= O. pubescens =

O. pubescens may refer to:

- Oenothera pubescens, the South American evening-primrose, a plant species native to the Southwestern United States
- Ophryosporus pubescens, a flowering plant species found in Peru
- Opuntia pubescens, a cactus species in the genus Opuntia
- Otholobium pubescens, a plant species found in Peru
