= Alexandra Daisy Ginsberg =

British artist (born 1982)

Alexandra Daisy Ginsberg RDI
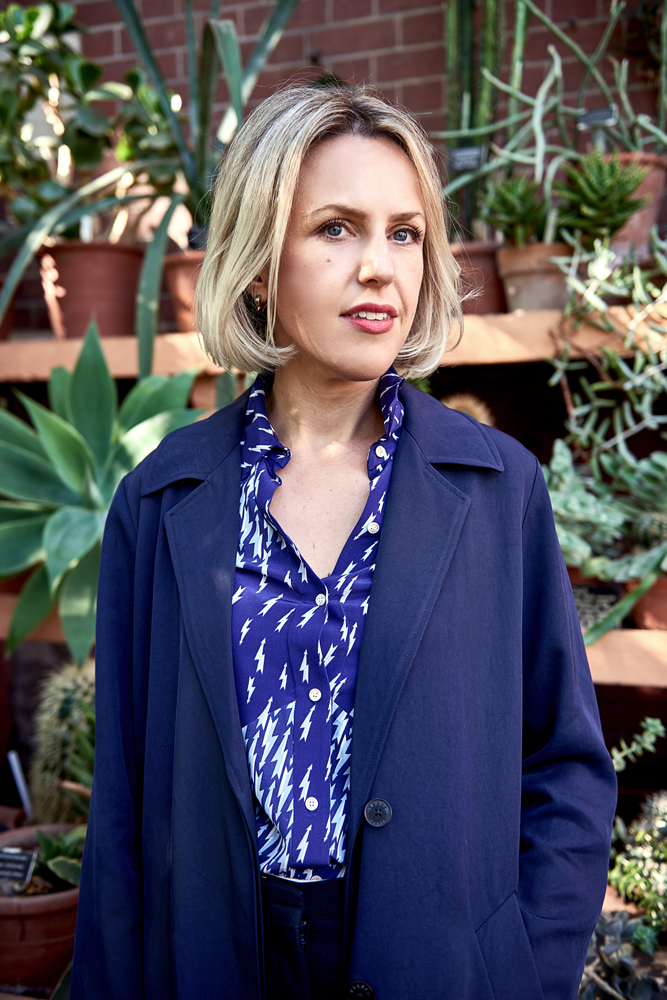
- Ginsberg by Natalie Théry in 2018
- Born: Alexandra Daisy Ginsberg; 1982 (age 43–44); London
- Website: daisyginsberg.com

Alexandra Daisy Ginsberg (born 1982) is a British and South African artist who lives and works in London, UK. She is known for artworks that explore the relationship between humans, technology, and nature. Many of her works are achieved using artificial intelligence and synthetic biology.

== Early life and education ==
Ginsberg completed an MA (Cantab) in Architecture from the University of Cambridge in 2004. She attended Harvard University as a visiting student between 2005 and 2006. In 2009, she received an MA in Design Interactions at the Royal College of Art, London, UK. In 2017, Ginsberg completed a PhD at the Royal College of Art. Her thesis explored the notion of 'better' in relation to design and synthetic biology.

== Career ==
Ginsberg’s artworks focus on humans' relationship with the non-human world, broaching themes such as artificial intelligence, synthetic biology, biodiversity, nature, conservation, and evolution. Her background in design and synthetic biology often informs her artistic practice.

Her installations have been shown at the Centre Pompidou, Museum of Modern Art, Somerset House, Museum of Contemporary Art Tokyo and Royal Academy.

Ginsberg has exhibited her projects at various institutions, including the Natural History Museum, London; Serpentine Gallery, London; Royal Academy, London; Museo Nacional Thyssen-Bornemisza, Madrid; Centre Pompidou, Paris; V&A Museum, London; MIT, Boston; Museum of Modern Art, New York and TED Global.

She has been the recipient of awards including the 2023 S+T+ARTS Prize – Grand Prize for Artistic Exploration; Breakthrough of the Year, Science in the Arts, Falling Walls, 2020; the Rapoport Award for Women in Art & Tech, 2019; Changemaker Award, Dezeen, 2019; London Design Medal, 2012; and Future 50, Icon Magazine, 2013.

Ginsberg was appointed to the Royal Designers for Industry (RDI) by the Royal Society for Arts (RSA) in 2025.

== Notable works ==
Using AI and speculative thinking, Ginsberg created a piece titled The Sixth Extinction. The work showcases the potential of synthetic biology when it is meshed with ecosystem conservation. The piece highlights the idea of organisms designed to protect disappearing ecosystems. There is also underlying juxtaposition regarding government ownership and industrialization of nature. This work was showcased by the Science Gallery at Trinity College of Dublin in the Grow Your Own exhibition. Ginsberg is listed as a curator, along with Michael John Gorman, Paul Freemont, Anthony Dunne, and Cathal Gravey. This exhibition ran from December 25, 2013 to January 19, 2014.

Resurrecting the Sublime is a collaborative series of immersive installations showcasing the combination of extracted DNA and synthetic fragrance technologies. These immersive experiences allow individuals to experience the fragrance of extinct flowers that are lost as a result of imperialist conquest. These flowers include the Hibiscadelphus wilderianus, Orbexilum stipulatum, and Leucadendron grandiflorum. Ginsberg collaborated alongside Sissel Tolaas and Christina Agapakis, leading the researchers and engineers from Ginkgo Bioworks.

In 2021, Ginsberg was commissioned by the Eden Project to create a pollinator-friendly artwork, Pollinator Pathmaker Project, taking the shape of gardens generated by an algorithm. The algorithm was designed to be empathetic to how insects see the world and what they consider art. The goal behind the project was to maximize pollinator diversity and create multi species artwork collaborating with plants, animals, and people.

The Lost Rhino is a four part display of the endangered northern white rhino. One of the representations is a projection called 'The Substitute'. Ginsberg created this piece using AI technology meshed with footage of the last of its kind. This piece is a commentary on how conservation is becoming less about existing animals while the issue of disappearance is still at hand. The other three parts of the display were also curated by Ginsberg. These include facsimile inaccurate prints of the northern white rhino by Albrecht Düer from the 16th century, a film depicting the growing heart cells from the deceased northern rhino Angalifu, and subspecies taxidermy of the southern white rhino.

== Collections ==
- Art Institute of Chicago
- Cooper Hewitt
- ZKM Center for Art and Media Karlsruhe

== Exhibitions ==
- July 11 – October 5, 2025, Design Museum London: Part of More than Human
