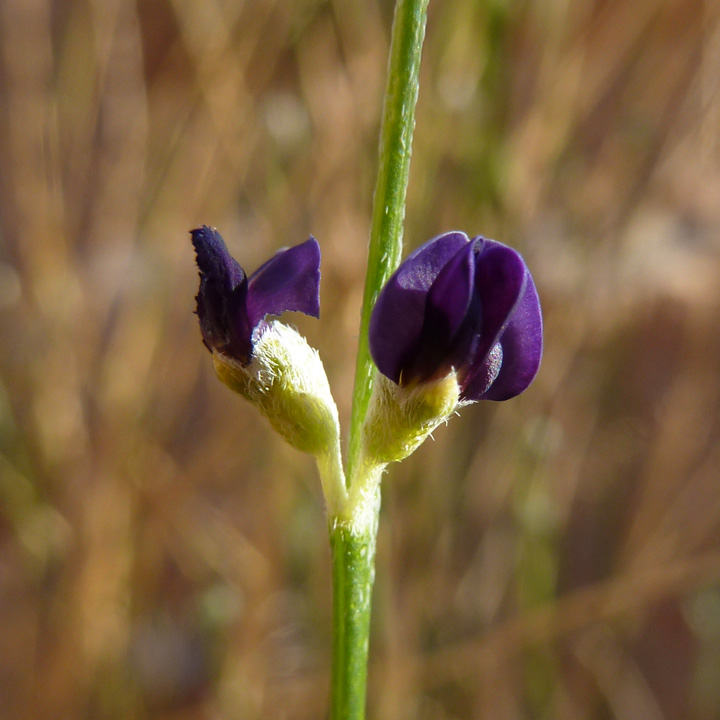

Conservation status
- Vulnerable (NatureServe)

Scientific classification
- Kingdom: Plantae
- Clade: Tracheophytes
- Clade: Angiosperms
- Clade: Eudicots
- Clade: Rosids
- Order: Fabales
- Family: Fabaceae
- Genus: Ladeania
- Species: L. juncea

Binomial name
- Ladeania juncea (Eastw.) Reveal & A.N.Egan

Synonyms
- Psoralea juncea Eastw. (1896); Psoralidium junceum (Eastw.) Rydb. (1919)

= Ladeania juncea =

Plant species in the pea family

Ladeania juncea is a species of flowering plant in the legume family, commonly known as rush lemonweed, or rush scurfpea. It is native to southwestern North America where it is only known from Arizona and Utah. It grows on sand dunes, among shrubs on semi-stabilized sands, on mudflats encrusted with salt, and on bare rocky slopes.

== Taxonomy ==
Ladeania juncea was scientifically described by the botanist Alice Eastwood in 1896. At that time she named it Psoralea juncea. In 1919 Per Axel Rydberg reclassified it with the name Psoralidium junceum. It was given its present name by James L. Reveal and Ashley Noel Egan in 2009.

The name Ladeania juncea is listed as accepted by Plants of the World Online, World Flora Online, and World Plants. It continues to be listed as Psoralidium lanceolatum by the USDA Natural Resources Conservation Service PLANTS database.

== Distribution and habitat ==
Ladeania juncea is endemic to the southwestern United States where it is restricted to the southern part of Kane and San Juan counties in Utah and the northern part of Coconino County in Arizona. A separate population is found in eastern Garfield County, Utah. The plant is locally abundant in the vicinity of the Paria River, the San Juan River and the Colorado River but scarce elsewhere. It tends to dominate the plant communities where its specific habitat requirements are met. Its altitudinal range is between 1,000 and 1,750 m (3,300 and 5,700 ft). Its conservation status is classified as "vulnerable" in Utah and as "critically imperilled" in Arizona.
