= Orbexilum virgatum =

Scientific classification
- Kingdom: Plantae
- Clade: Tracheophytes
- Clade: Angiosperms
- Clade: Eudicots
- Clade: Rosids
- Order: Fabales
- Family: Fabaceae
- Subfamily: Faboideae
- Genus: Orbexilum
- Species: O. virgatum

Binomial name
- Orbexilum virgatum (Nutt.) Rydb.

Synonyms
- Psoralea virgata; Lotodes virgata

Species of flowering plant

Orbexilum virgatum, commonly known as the pineland leather-root or slender leather-root, is a flowering plant that grows in Georgia and northeast Florida. It is a perennial, grows 30-60cm tall with 3-8cm long leaves and has purple to dark-blue flowers. It is in the Orbexilum genus and Fabaceae family. It grows in pineland savannahs. It is endangered. It has also been classified as Psoralea virgata and Lotodes virgata. It has also been referred to as pineland scurfpea.
