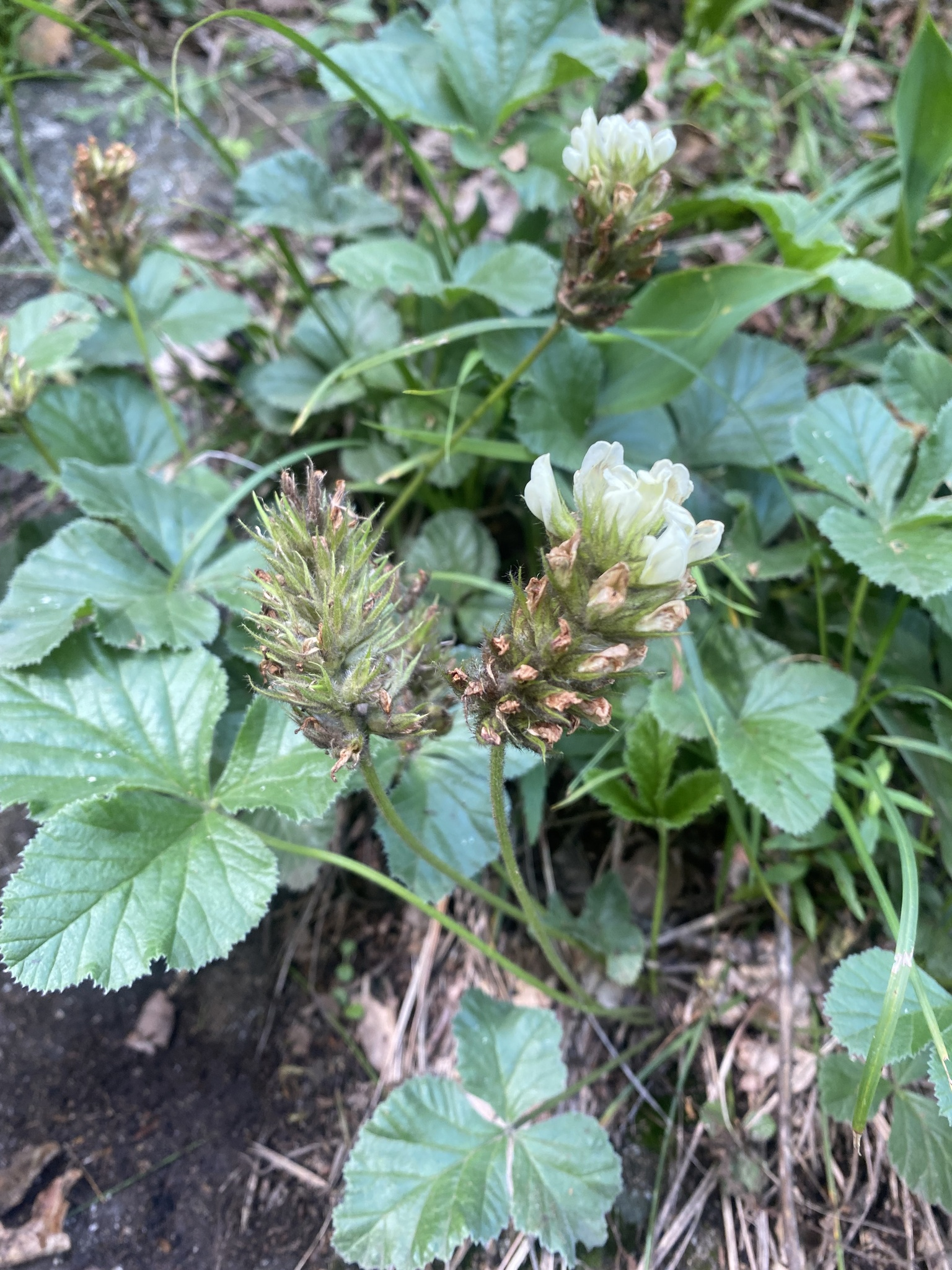

Scientific classification
- Kingdom: Plantae
- Clade: Tracheophytes
- Clade: Angiosperms
- Clade: Eudicots
- Clade: Rosids
- Order: Fabales
- Family: Fabaceae
- Subfamily: Faboideae
- Clade: Millettioids
- Tribe: Psoraleeae
- Genus: Kartalinia; Brullo, C.Brullo, Cambria, Acar, Salmeri & Giusso (2018)
- Species: K. acaulis

Binomial name
- Kartalinia acaulis (Hoffm.) Brullo, C.Brullo, Cambria, Acar, Salmeri & Giusso (2018)

Synonyms
- Aspalthium acaulis (Steven ex M.Bieb.) Hutch. (1964); Bituminaria acaulis (Steven ex M.Bieb.) C.H.Stirt. (1981); Lotodes acaule (Steven ex M.Bieb.) Kuntze (1891); Psoralea acaulis Hoffm. (1808); Psoralea acaulis Steven ex M.Bieb. (1808); Rhynchodium acaule (Steven ex M.Bieb.) C.Presl (1845)

= Kartalinia =

Genus of flowering plants

Kartalinia acaulis is a species of flowering plant in the legume family, Fabaceae. It is the sole species in genus Kartalinia. It is a perennial native to Turkey and the Caucasus.
