= Grimolobium =

Scientific classification
- Kingdom: Plantae
- Clade: Tracheophytes
- Clade: Angiosperms
- Clade: Eudicots
- Clade: Rosids
- Order: Fabales
- Family: Fabaceae
- Subfamily: Faboideae
- Tribe: Psoraleeae
- Genus: Grimolobium; A.N.Egan, C.H.Stirt. & A.Bello

Genus of flowering plants

Grimolobium is a genus of flowering plants in the family Fabaceae. It includes eight species native to South America.

Species in the genus were formerly placed in genus Otholobium, which included both South American and African species. A phylogenetic analysis published in 2024 found that the South American species formed a distinct clade, and the new genus Grimolobium was described to include them. The genus is named in honor of James Grimes, a botanist who did distinguished work on New World species in tribe Psoraleeae.

== Species ==
Eight species are accepted.

- Grimolobium brachystachyum (Spruce ex Diels) A.N.Egan & C.H.Stirt.
- Grimolobium diffidens (J.W.Grimes) A.N.Egan & C.H.Stirt.
- Grimolobium glandulosum (L.) A.N.Egan & C.H.Stirt.
- Grimolobium higuerilla (Gillies ex Hook. & Arn.) A.N.Egan & C.H.Stirt.
- Grimolobium holosericeum (Barneby) A.N.Egan & C.H.Stirt.
- Grimolobium mexicanum (L.fil.) A.N.Egan & C.H.Stirt.
- Grimolobium munyense (J.F.Macbr.) A.N.Egan & C.H.Stirt.
- Grimolobium pubescens (Poir.) A.N.Egan & C.H.Stirt.
