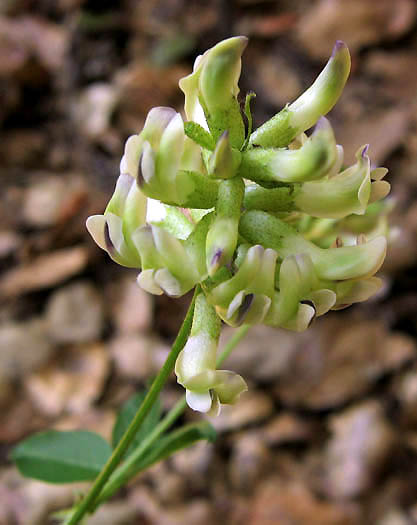

Scientific classification
- Kingdom: Plantae
- Clade: Tracheophytes
- Clade: Angiosperms
- Clade: Eudicots
- Clade: Rosids
- Order: Fabales
- Family: Fabaceae
- Subfamily: Faboideae
- Genus: Rupertia
- Species: R. physodes

Binomial name
- Rupertia physodes (Hook.) J.W.Grimes

Synonyms
- Psoralea physodes

= Rupertia physodes =

Species of legume

Rupertia physodes is a species of flowering plant known by the common names forest scurfpea and California tea.

It is native to west coast and coastal mountains of California, and northwards through the Cascade Range into Idaho and British Columbia.

== Description ==
Rupertia physodes is a low bushy perennial with often recumbent branches that may form a dense ground cover. It has deep, woody roots and grows well on the dry edges of woods and prairies where it flowers in late spring and summer when few other nectar sources remain available.

It has trifoliate leaves with three dark green tear-shaped entire leaflets which are smooth overall to sparsely hairy along the veins.

The flowers are crowded on an auxiliary raceme, approximately 5 centimetres (2.0 in) long and with approximately 25–40 flowers. The individual papilionaceous (pea-like) flowers are white to cream colored, tinged with green or purple when freshly opened and fading to a rusty brown. A notable characteristic of this species is that the calyx continues to grow after the flower is shed and it soon becomes much longer than the developing seed pod, forming a large expanded conical collar around the one-seeded pod.

At maturity the grayish one-seeded pod is tomentulose and membranaceous and can be easily rubbed off the single shiny black 5 millimetres (0.2 in) long reniform seed that it tightly encloses. The mature bracts have a light resinous aromatic odor reminiscent of hops.
