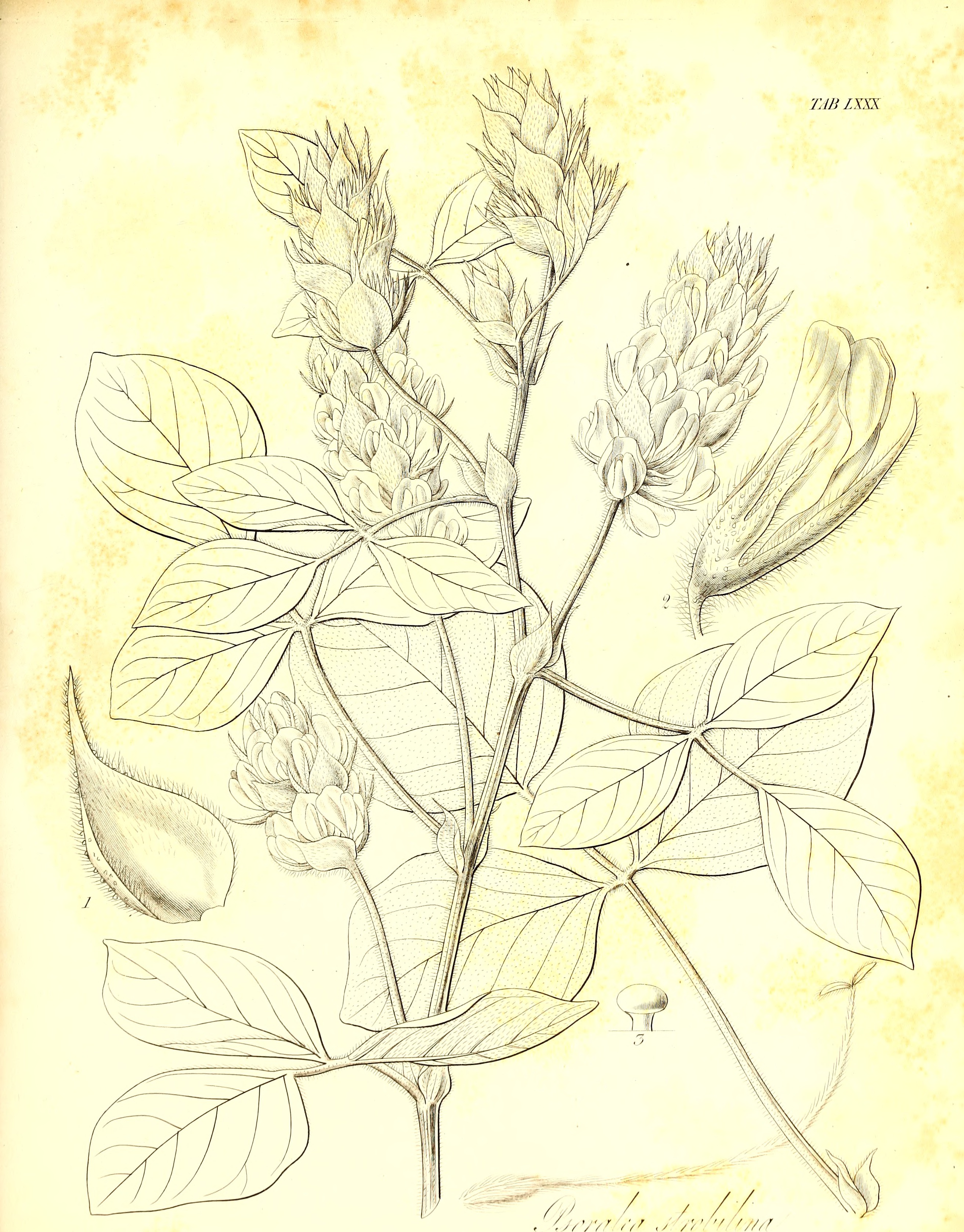

Conservation status
- Imperiled (NatureServe)

Scientific classification
- Kingdom: Plantae
- Clade: Tracheophytes
- Clade: Angiosperms
- Clade: Eudicots
- Clade: Rosids
- Order: Fabales
- Family: Fabaceae
- Subfamily: Faboideae
- Genus: Hoita
- Species: H. strobilina

Binomial name
- Hoita strobilina (Hook. & Arn.) Rydb.

Synonyms
- Psoralea strobilina

= Hoita strobilina =

Species of legume

Hoita strobilina is a rare species of legume known by the common name Loma Prieta leatherroot, or Loma Prieta hoita. It is endemic to California, where it is known from occasional occurrences in the San Francisco Bay Area. It grows in chaparral and woodland habitats in the local mountains, often on serpentine soil. This is a perennial herb growing erect, approaching a meter in maximum height. The large leaves are divided into three leaflets each up to 8 centimeters long and lance-shaped to nearly round. The herbage is generally glandular and hairy. The inflorescence is a raceme up to 13 centimeters long containing many pealike flowers. Each flower is purple, sometimes with white parts, and one to two centimeters long. The fruit is a dark brown or black, hairy, veiny legume pod.
