= Orbexilum lupinellus =

Scientific classification
- Kingdom: Plantae
- Clade: Tracheophytes
- Clade: Angiosperms
- Clade: Eudicots
- Clade: Rosids
- Order: Fabales
- Family: Fabaceae
- Subfamily: Faboideae
- Genus: Orbexilum
- Species: O. lupinellus

Binomial name
- Orbexilum lupinellus (Michx.) Isely

Species of flowering plant

Orbexilum lupinellus (commonly known as Piedmont leather-root, lupine scurfpea, or lupine leather-root) is a perennial herb that can be found in the south-eastern United States.

== Description ==
Orbexilum lupinellus possesses stems that reach a height between 25 and 30 cm (10 and 12 in). The leaves are palmately dissected into 5 to 7 leaflets. The leaflets are linear to oblanceolate in shape, and reach a length between 2 and 7 cm (0.8 and 2.8 in) with a width of 0.5 and 2 mm (0.02 and 0.08 in).

== Distribution and habitat ==
Within the United States O. lupinellus can be found in the southeastern Coastal Plain, ranging from southern North Carolina to central Florida, Georgia, and Alabama. It is also native to Mexico.

This species has been observed in habitats such as longleaf pine sandhills.
