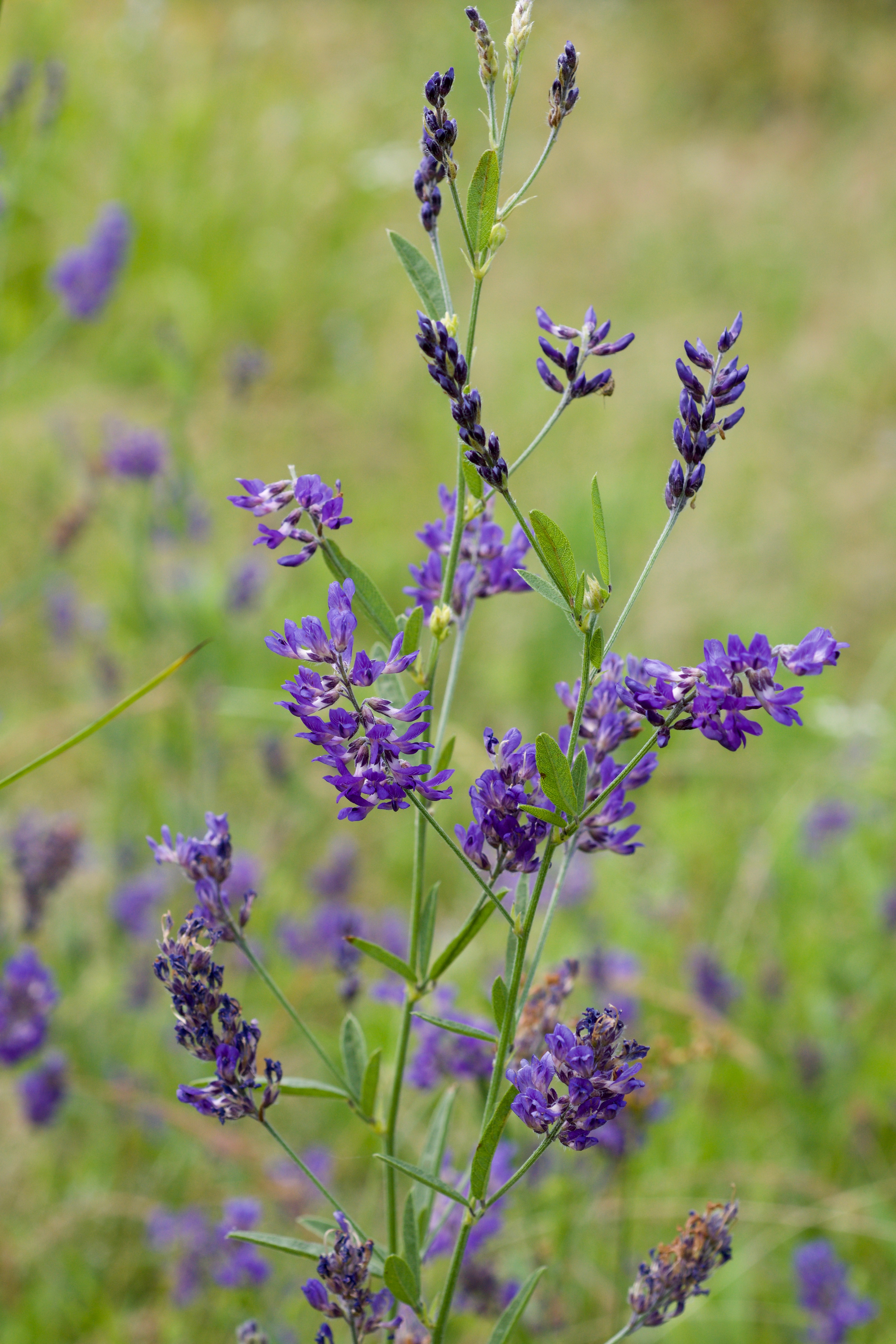

Conservation status
- Apparently Secure (NatureServe)

Scientific classification
- Kingdom: Plantae
- Clade: Tracheophytes
- Clade: Angiosperms
- Clade: Eudicots
- Clade: Rosids
- Order: Fabales
- Family: Fabaceae
- Subfamily: Faboideae
- Genus: Orbexilum
- Species: O. simplex

Binomial name
- Orbexilum simplex (P. Miller) Rydberg

= Orbexilum simplex =

Species of legume

Orbexilum simplex (common names singlestem leather-root and leather-root) is a species of flowering plant in the legume family known by the common name singlestem leather-root. It is found in the south-central United States.
