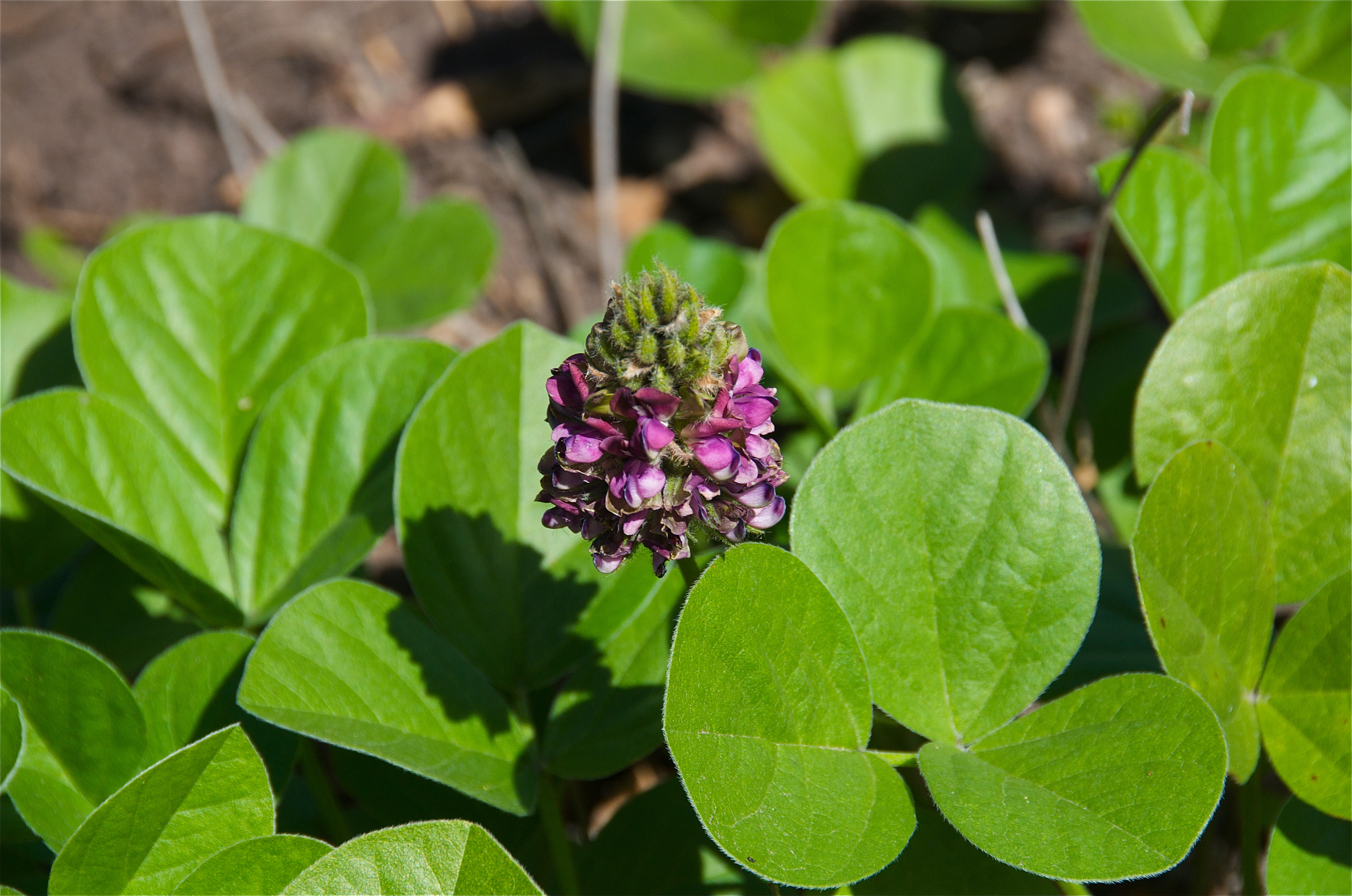

Scientific classification
- Kingdom: Plantae
- Clade: Tracheophytes
- Clade: Angiosperms
- Clade: Eudicots
- Clade: Rosids
- Order: Fabales
- Family: Fabaceae
- Subfamily: Faboideae
- Genus: Hoita
- Species: H. orbicularis

Binomial name
- Hoita orbicularis (Lindl.) Rydb.

Synonyms
- Psoralea orbicularis

= Hoita orbicularis =

Species of legume

Hoita orbicularis is a species of legume known by the common name roundleaf leather-root. It is endemic to California, where it is relatively widespread throughout the state's mountain ranges, growing most often in moist habitat. It is a perennial herb growing prostrate or nearly so at ground level with large leaves each made up of three round leaflets up to 11 centimetres (4 1/4 in) long each. The herbage is glandular and often hairy. The inflorescence is an erect raceme which may be up to 35 centimetres (13 2/3 in) long. Each of the many flowers is one or two centimeters long, pealike, and generally a shade of light to medium purple in color. The fruit is a hairy, veiny legume pod just under 1 centimetre (1/2 in) long.
