= Rupertia rigida =

Scientific classification
- Kingdom: Plantae
- Clade: Tracheophytes
- Clade: Angiosperms
- Clade: Eudicots
- Clade: Rosids
- Order: Fabales
- Family: Fabaceae
- Subfamily: Faboideae
- Genus: Rupertia
- Species: R. rigida

Binomial name
- Rupertia rigida (Parish) J.W.Grimes

Synonyms
- Psoralea rigida

Species of legume

Rupertia rigida is a species of flowering plant in the legume family known by the common name Parish's California tea, or Parish's rupertia.

It is native to southern California and Baja California, where it is an uncommon member of the local mountain flora, growing in chaparral, woodland, and forest habitat types.

== Description ==
It is a bushy perennial herb producing a hairy, woody stem from a thick, purplish caudex, approaching 75 centimeters in maximum height with slender, leafy branches. The leaves are each made up of three hairy, glandular, lance-shaped leaflets up to 6 or 7 centimeters long.

The inflorescence is a clustered raceme of several whitish or yellowish pealike flowers. Each flower has a tubular calyx of sepals and a corolla spreading to about 1.5 centimeters in width.

The fruit is a hairy, gland-speckled, brownish legume around a centimeter long.
