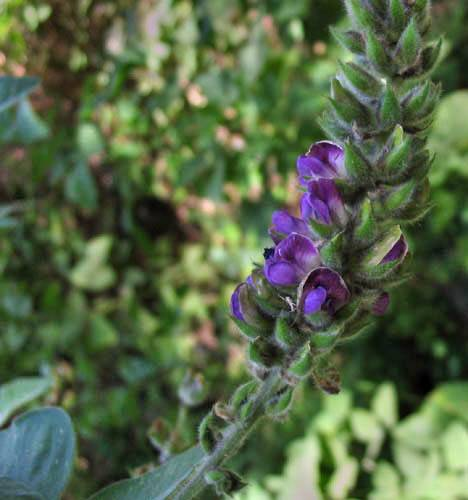

Scientific classification
- Kingdom: Plantae
- Clade: Tracheophytes
- Clade: Angiosperms
- Clade: Eudicots
- Clade: Rosids
- Order: Fabales
- Family: Fabaceae
- Subfamily: Faboideae
- Genus: Hoita
- Species: H. macrostachya

Binomial name
- Hoita macrostachya (DC.) Rydb.

Synonyms
- Hoita longiloba Hoita rhombifolia Hoita villosa Psoralea douglasii Psoralea macrostachya

= Hoita macrostachya =

Species of legume

Hoita macrostachya is a species of legume known by the common names California hemp and large leather-root. It is native to California and Baja California where it can be found in moist areas of a number of habitat types. This is a hairy, glandular perennial herb producing a tall, branching stem approaching two meters in maximum height. The sparse, widely spaced leaves are each made up of three leaflets up to 10 centimeters long each attached to a long petiole. The leaflet blades are glandular. The plant produces many clublike raceme inflorescences on sturdy stalks from the stem. The inflorescence contains many purplish pealike flowers. The fruit is a hairy, veiny brown legume pod under a centimeter long containing a kidney-shaped seed.
