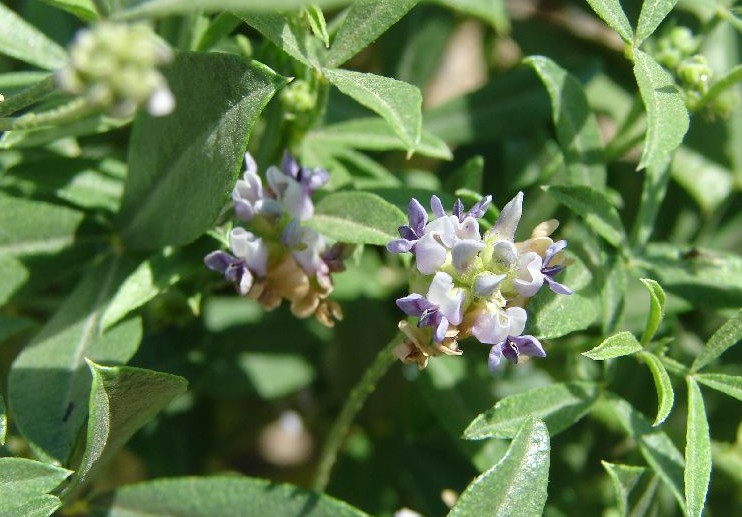

Conservation status
- Secure (NatureServe)

Scientific classification
- Kingdom: Plantae
- Clade: Tracheophytes
- Clade: Angiosperms
- Clade: Eudicots
- Clade: Rosids
- Order: Fabales
- Family: Fabaceae
- Subfamily: Faboideae
- Genus: Ladeania
- Species: L. lanceolata

Binomial name
- Ladeania lanceolata (Pursh) Reveal & A.N.Egan

Synonyms
- List: Lotodes ellipticum (Pursh) Kuntze (1891); Lotodes ellipticum var. angustissimum Kuntze (1891); Lotodes ellipticum var. latifolium Kuntze (1891); Lotodes micranthum (A.Gray) Kuntze (1891); Psoralea arenaria Nutt. (1818); Psoralea elliptica Pursh (1813); Psoralea lanceolata Pursh (1813); Psoralea lanceolata var. purshii (Vail) Piper (1901); Psoralea lanceolata subsp. scabra (Nutt.) Piper(1906); Psoralea lanceolata var. stenophylla (Rydb.) Toft & S.L.Welsh (1972); Psoralea lanceolata var. stenostachys (Rydb.) S.L.Welsh (1978); Psoralea laxiflora Nutt. (1838); Psoralea micrantha A.Gray (1857); Psoralea purshii Vail (1894); Psoralea scabra Nutt. (1838); Psoralea stenophylla Rydb. (1913); Psoralea stenostachys Rydb. (1913); Psoralidium lanceolatum (Pursh) Rydb. (1919); Psoralidium lanceolatum var. stenophyllum (Rydb.) S.L.Welsh (1986); Psoralidium lanceolatum var. stenostachys (Rydb.) S.L.Welsh (1986); Psoralidium micranthum (A.Gray) Rydb. (1919); Psoralidium purshii (Vail) Rydb. (1919); Psoralidium stenophyllum (Rydb.) Rydb. (1919); Psoralidium stenostachys (Rydb.) Rydb. (1919)

= Ladeania lanceolata =

Plant species in the pea family

Ladeania lanceolata (syn. Psoralidium lanceolatum) is a species of flowering plant in the legume family known by several common names, including lemon scurfpea, wild lemonweed, and dune scurfpea.

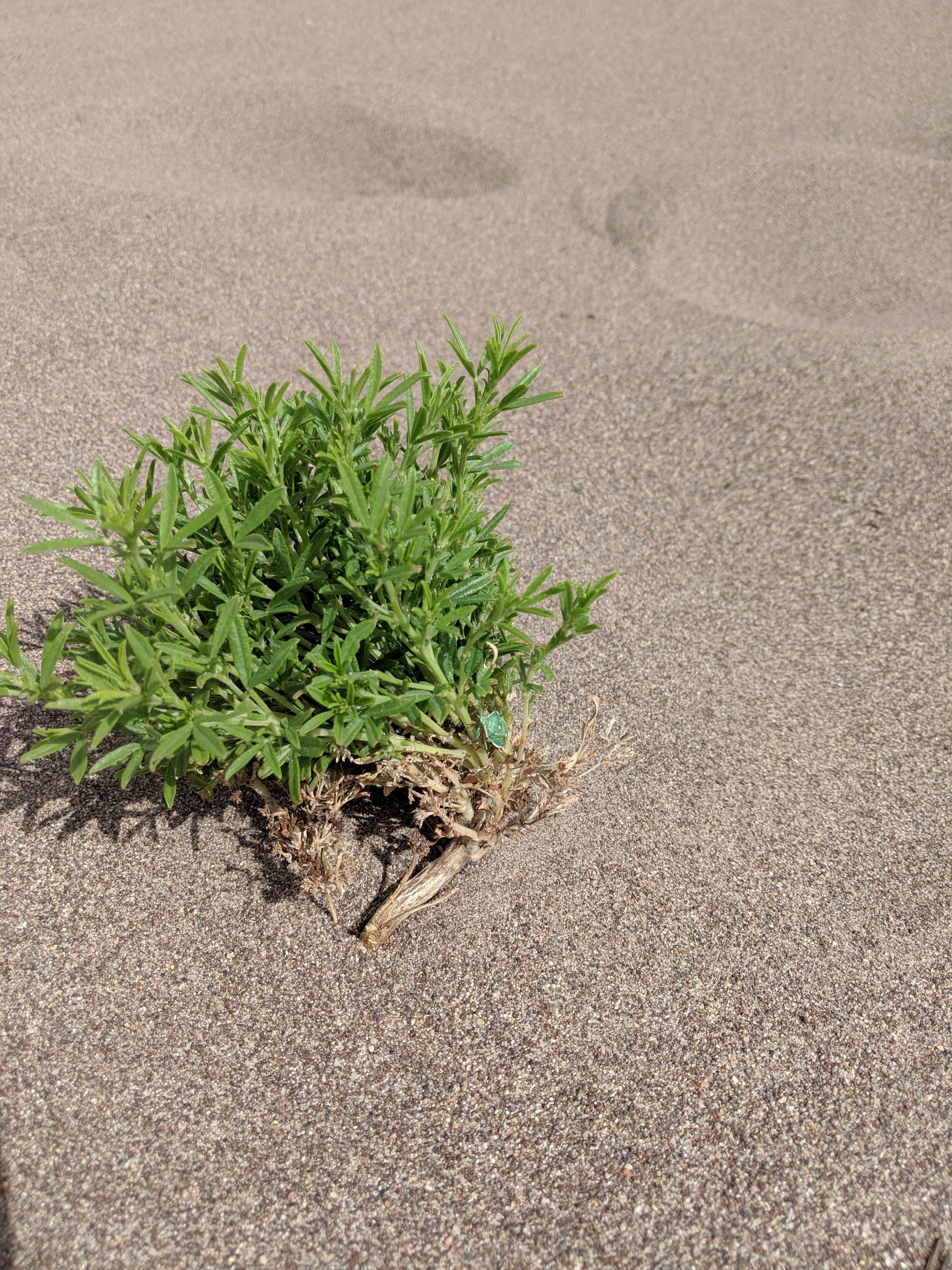
Taken in the Great Sand Dunes National Park, Colorado USA

It is native to western North America from central Canada to California to Texas, where it grows in sandy habitat, such as alluvial plains and sagebrush.

== Description ==
It is a perennial herb with a branching, heavily glandular stem growing 30 to 60 centimeters tall. The leaves are palmately compound, each made up of usually three linear or lance-shaped leaflets borne on a short petiole. The inflorescence is a raceme of flowers emerging from a leaf axil. Each flower is under a centimeter long with a pealike corolla in shades of light purple-blue to white. The fruit is a hairy, glandular, spherical legume.

== Taxonomy ==
Ladeania lanceolata was given its first scientific description by the botanist Frederick Traugott Pursh in 1813. He named it Psoralea lanceolata. It was moved to the genus Psoralidium by Per Axel Rydberg in 1919 with the name Psoralidium lanceolatum. He also separated out six variants as species that are now regarded as synonyms. In 2009 James Lauritz Reveal and Ashley Noel Egan published a paper where they reclassified with the name Ladeania lanceolata.

Ladeania lanceolata is listed as the accepted name by Plants of the World Online, World Flora Online, and World Plants. It continues to be listed as Psoralidium lanceolatum by the USDA Natural Resources Conservation Service PLANTS database.

== Traditional uses ==
The Zuni people eat the fresh flowers to treat stomachaches.
