= Ophryosporus densiflorus =

Conservation status
- Near Threatened (IUCN 3.1)

Scientific classification
- Kingdom: Plantae
- Clade: Tracheophytes
- Clade: Angiosperms
- Clade: Eudicots
- Clade: Asterids
- Order: Asterales
- Family: Asteraceae
- Genus: Ophryosporus
- Species: O. densiflorus

Binomial name
- Ophryosporus densiflorus (Benth.) R.M.King & H.Rob.

Species of shrub

Ophryosporus densiflorus is a flowering shrub in the family Asteraceae. It is found only in Ecuador. Its natural habitat is subtropical or tropical dry forests. It is threatened by habitat loss.
