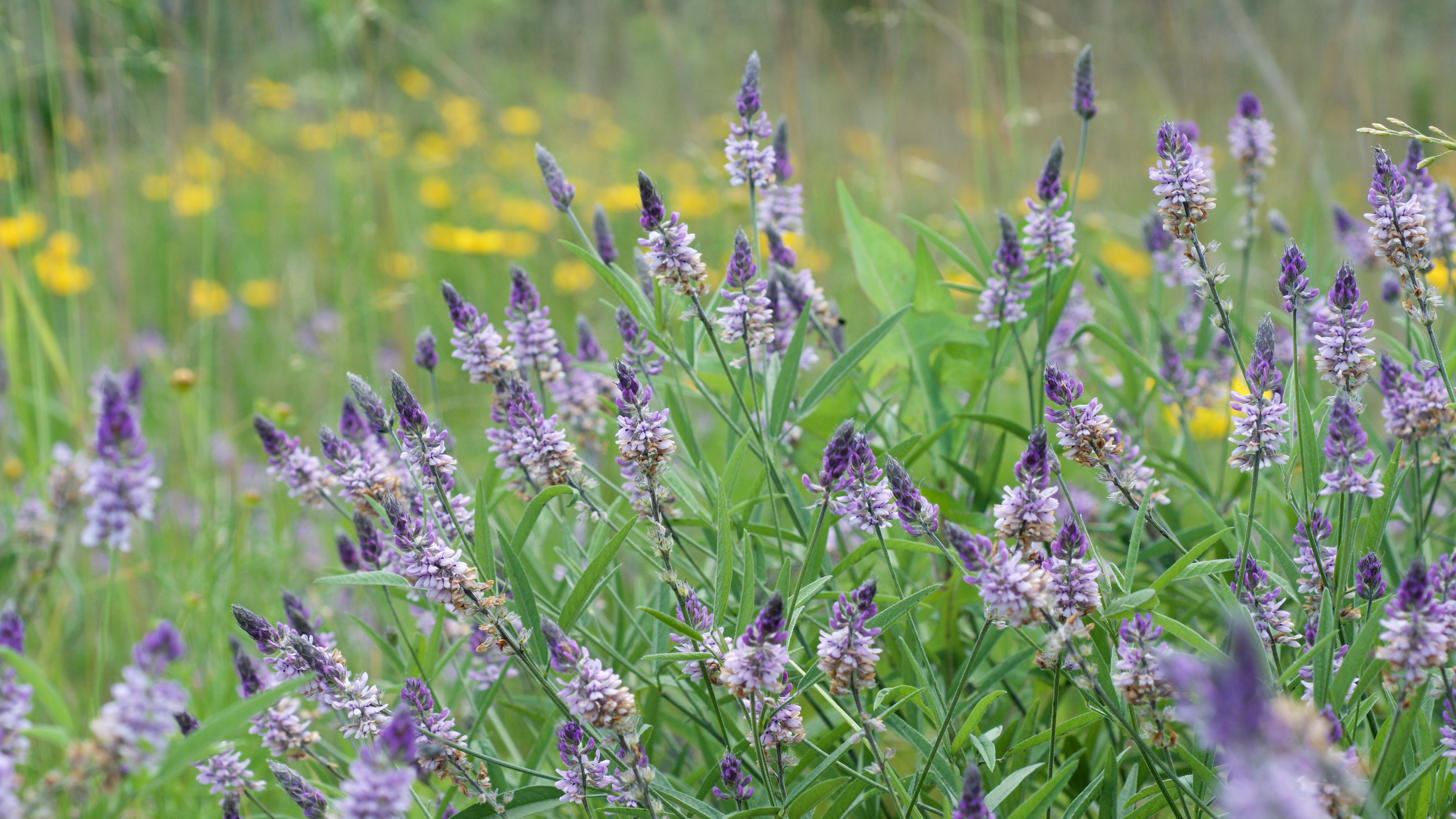

Conservation status
- Secure (NatureServe)

Scientific classification
- Kingdom: Plantae
- Clade: Tracheophytes
- Clade: Angiosperms
- Clade: Eudicots
- Clade: Rosids
- Order: Fabales
- Family: Fabaceae
- Subfamily: Faboideae
- Genus: Orbexilum
- Species: O. pedunculatum

Binomial name
- Orbexilum pedunculatum (P. Miller) Rydberg

= Orbexilum pedunculatum =

Species of legume

Orbexilum pedunculatum, commonly known as Sampson's snakeroot, is a species of flowering plant in the legume family. It is native primarily to the Southeastern United States where it is found in prairies and savannas, often in acidic soil. It is a perennial that produces racemes of flowers in early summer.

Two varieties have been named, which are sometimes considered distinct species. They are:

- Orbexilum pedunculatum var. pedunculatum – Native to a widespread area west of the Blue Ridge Mountains.
- Orbexilum pedunculatum var. psoralioides – Native primarily to the Atlantic coastal plain.

== Description ==
Orbexilum pedunculatum is a herbaceous perennial plant with a long taproot that grows to a height of 12 to 30 in (30 to 76 cm). The slender stem branches occasionally and is either hairless or slightly downy and bears alternate, trifoliate leaves. The petiole of each leaf is up to 2 in (5 cm) long and has a pair of small lanceolate stipules at its base. The leaflets are up to 3 in (8 cm) long and 0.75 in (2 cm) wide, ellipsoid or oblong, with entire margins and acute tips. The lateral leaflets have no stalks while the terminal leaflet has a short stalk. The leaves are a medium green and hairless on the upper surface. The inflorescences grow in dense racemes in the axils of some of the leaves. They are supported above the foliage on long, bare peduncles and are up to 4 in (10 cm) long. Each individual flower is 0.25 in (1 cm) long and has the five petals arranged as is typical in the pea family. The flowers are blue-violet in bud but pale violet to white when open. They are followed by nearly circular, flat seedpods with crinkled edges, each containing a single seed.

== Distribution ==
Orbexilum pedunculatum is native to the southern and southeastern parts of the United States. It is found in Alabama, Arkansas, Florida, Georgia, Illinois, Indiana, Kansas, Kentucky, Louisiana, Maryland, Michigan, Missouri, Mississippi, North Carolina, Ohio, Oklahoma, South Carolina, Tennessee, Texas and Virginia. It typically grows on prairies and savannas, and on well-drained, sandy soils in woodland.

== Uses ==
This plant has traditional uses in Cherokee Native American herbal medicine; the roots are used to make a topically applied salve to help knit broken bones and as treatment for wounds, ulcers and boils; other parts of the plant are used as a tonic, to relieve indigestion, to induce sweating and to stimulate blood flow during menstruation. Not to be confused with other "snakeroot" plants such as Aristolochia serpentaria (contains toxic aristolochic acids; also known as Virginia snakeroot), Ageratina altissima (contains toxic tremetol, also known as white snakeroot), Actaea racemosa (also known as black snakeroot and black cohosh) or Sanicula canadensis (Canadian blacksnakeroot).
