= Rupertia hallii =

Conservation status
- Imperiled (NatureServe)

Scientific classification
- Kingdom: Plantae
- Clade: Tracheophytes
- Clade: Angiosperms
- Clade: Eudicots
- Clade: Rosids
- Order: Fabales
- Family: Fabaceae
- Subfamily: Faboideae
- Genus: Rupertia
- Species: R. hallii

Binomial name
- Rupertia hallii (Rydb.) J.W. Grimes

Synonyms
- Hoita hallii Psoralea hallii

Species of legume

Rupertia hallii is a species of flowering plant in the legume family known by the common name Hall's California tea, or Hall's rupertia. It is endemic to California, where it is known only from a small section of the northern Sierra Nevada foothills on the border between Butte and Tehama Counties. It is a perennial herb approaching a meter in height with slender, leafy branches. The leaves are each made up of three lance-shaped or oval, pointed leaflets measuring up to 9 centimeters long. The inflorescence is a clustered raceme of several whitish or yellowish pealike flowers. Each flower has a tubular calyx of sepals and a corolla spreading to about a centimeter in width. The fruit is a hairy, gland-speckled legume around a centimeter long.
