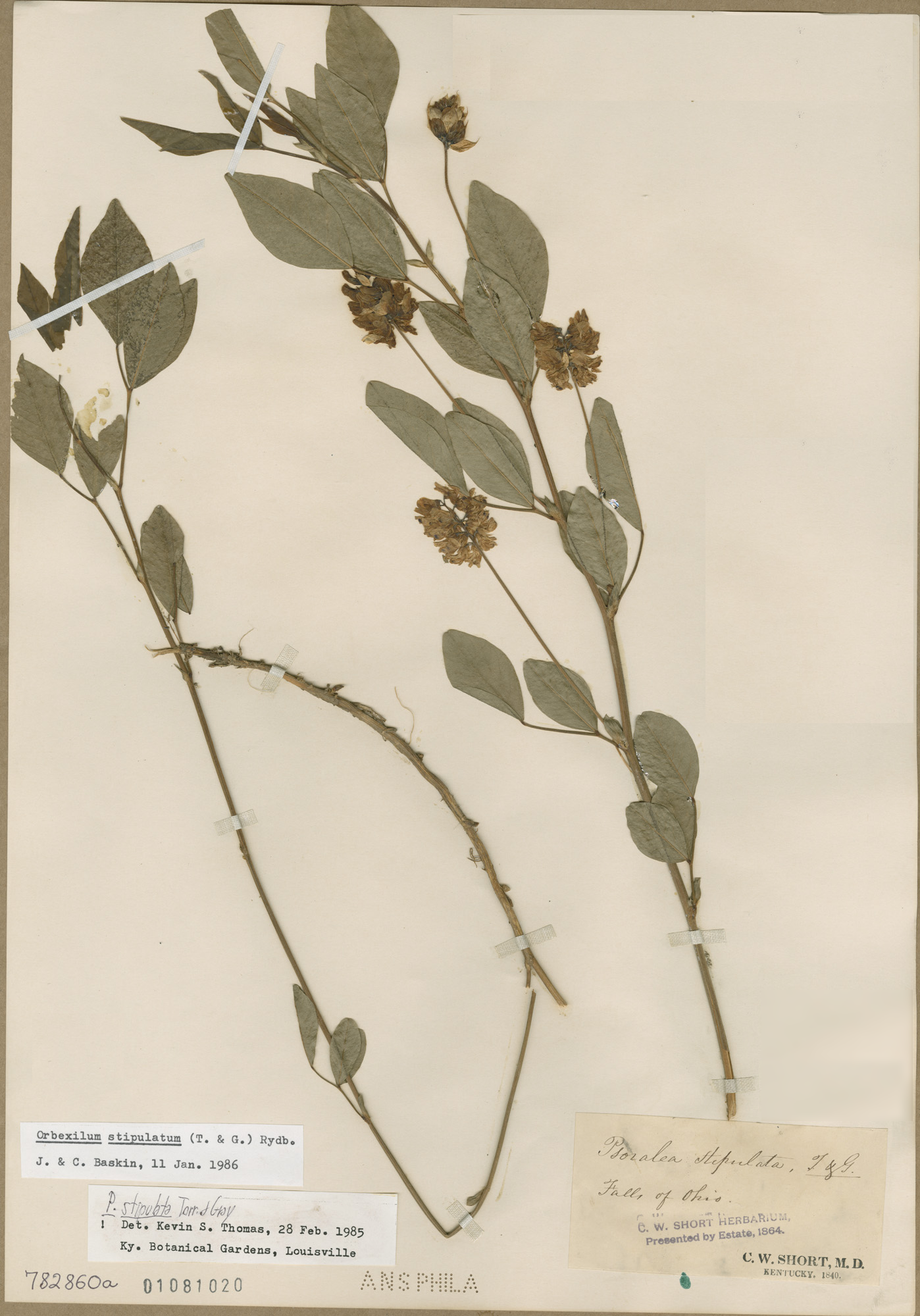

Conservation status
- Presumed Extinct (NatureServe)

Scientific classification
- Kingdom: Plantae
- Clade: Tracheophytes
- Clade: Angiosperms
- Clade: Eudicots
- Clade: Rosids
- Order: Fabales
- Family: Fabaceae
- Subfamily: Faboideae
- Genus: Orbexilum
- Species: O. stipulatum

Binomial name
- Orbexilum stipulatum (Torr.) A.Gray

= Orbexilum stipulatum =

Extinct species of legume

Orbexilum stipulatum, the largestipule leather-root or Falls-of-the-Ohio scurfpea, was a flowering plant that was endemic to Rock Island in the Falls of the Ohio; an area of rapids and rocky limestone outcrops in Kentucky's portion of the Ohio River. No live individuals have been found since 1881 and it is presumed to be extinct.

== Overview ==
Orbexilum stipulatum is thought to have been associated with large herbivore congregations. Rock Island in the Falls of the Ohio area was the shallowest part of the Ohio River, which historically was heavily used for the migration of American buffalo. The plant's population may have collapsed following the eradication of buffalo. If this factor alone had not extirpated Orbexilum stipulatum already, Rock Island and the associated rapids were flooded in the 1920s by the creation of US Dam 41, which sealed the fate for Orbexilum stipulatum at the Falls of the Ohio.

Although all searches to rediscover Orbexilum stipulatum have thus far been unsuccessful, two other species strongly associated with buffalo that were once thought to be extinct, Trifolium stoloniferum and Solidago shortii, have been rediscovered on old buffalo trails and a mineral lick. Solidago shortii also once had a population on Rock Island. However, O. stipulatum differs in that in the 20 years it was monitored by botanists, it was never once observed to produce seed. This suggests it was either a relict species or a hybrid, and casts doubt as to its ability to have colonized beyond Rock Island.

Orbexilum stipulatum is still considered an enigma as it has confused many botanists with its exact species type. Scientist Rydberg has suggested it belongs to the genus Desmodium (Rydberg 1926). His traditional assignment inspected the inflorescence, basis of foliage, and flower structure, which found similarities between these two taxa.
