= Bakuchiol =

- Chemical structure of bakuchiol

Names
- Preferred IUPAC name 4-[(1E,3S)-3-Ethenyl-3,7-dimethylocta-1,6-dien-1-yl]phenol
- Other names (+)-Bakuchiol

Identifiers
CAS Number	10309-37-2
3D model (JSmol)	Interactive image
ChEMBL	ChEMBL262344
ChemSpider	4579217
DrugBank	DB16102
ECHA InfoCard	100.211.101
EC Number	685-515-4
PubChem CID	5468522
UNII	OT12HJU3AR
CompTox Dashboard (EPA)	DTXSID401035664
- InChI: InChI=1S/C18H24O/c1-5-18(4,13-6-7-15(2)3)14-12-16-8-10-17(19)11-9-16/h5,7-12,14,19H,1,6,13H2,2-4H3/b14-12+/t18-/m1/s1 Key: LFYJSSARVMHQJB-QIXNEVBVSA-N; InChI=1/C18H24O/c1-5-18(4,13-6-7-15(2)3)14-12-16-8-10-17(19)11-9-16/h5,7-12,14,19H,1,6,13H2,2-4H3/b14-12+/t18-/m1/s1 Key: LFYJSSARVMHQJB-QIXNEVBVBX
- SMILES: Oc1ccc(/C=C/[C@@](\C=C)(C)CC\C=C(/C)C)cc1

Properties
Chemical formula	C_{18}H_{24}O
Molar mass	256.389 g·mol^{−1}
- Except where otherwise noted, data are given for materials in their standard state (at 25 °C [77 °F], 100 kPa). verify (what is ?) Infobox references

Bakuchiol is a meroterpenoid (a chemical compound having a partial terpenoid structure) in the class terpenophenol.

It was first isolated in 1966 by Mehta et al. from Psoralea corylifolia seed and was called Bakuchiol based on the Sanskrit name of the plant, Bakuchi. Bakuchiol is a meroterpene phenol abundant in and mainly obtained from the seeds of the P. corylifolia plant, which is widely used in Indian Ayurveda to treat a variety of diseases. It has also been isolated from other plants, such as P. glandulosa, P. drupaceae, Ulmus davidiana, Otholobium pubescens, Piper longum and Aerva sanguinolenta Blum.

Even though the first complete synthesis of Bakuchiol was described in 1973, its first commercial use in topical applications did not occur until 2007 when it was introduced to the market under the trade name Sytenol A by Sytheon Ltd.

It has been reported to have anticancer activity in preclinical models, possibly due to its structural similarity with resveratrol. One study in rats suggested that Bakuchiol and ethanol extracts of the Chinese medicinal plant Psoralea corylifolia could protect against bone loss.

Bakuchiol possesses antioxidant, anti-inflammatory (in mice), and in vitro antibacterial properties. Bakuchiol isolated from P. corylifolia has shown activity against numerous Gram-positive and Gram-negative oral pathogens. It was able to inhibit the growth of Streptococcus mutans under a range of sucrose concentrations, pH values and in the presence of organic acids in a temperature-dependent manner and also inhibited the growth of cells adhered to a glass surface.

Despite having no structural resemblance to retinol, Bakuchiol was found to have retinol functionality through retinol-like regulation of gene expression. In 2018, a randomized, double-blind, 12-week clinical study with 44 volunteers demonstrated that Bakuchiol is comparable with retinol in its ability to improve photoaging (wrinkles, hyperpigmentation) but has a better skin tolerance.

Bakuchiol has been found to possess antiandrogenic activity in prostate cancer cells, which inhibited cell proliferation.

== See also ==
- Drupanol
