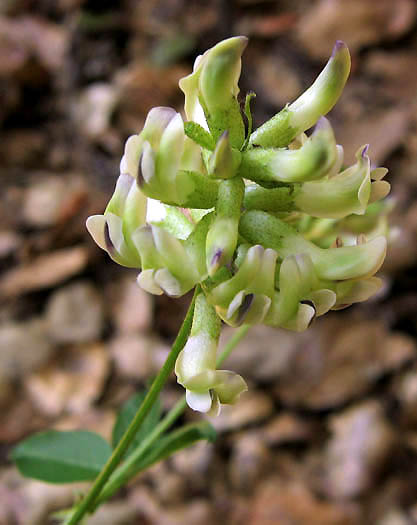
- Rupertia physodes

Scientific classification
- Kingdom: Plantae
- Clade: Tracheophytes
- Clade: Angiosperms
- Clade: Eudicots
- Clade: Rosids
- Order: Fabales
- Family: Fabaceae
- Subfamily: Faboideae
- Tribe: Psoraleeae
- Genus: Rupertia; J.W.Grimes

Species
- 3, see text

= Rupertia =

Genus of legumes

Rupertia is a small genus of flowering plants in the legume family, Fabaceae. It belongs to the subfamily Faboideae. There are three species native to western North America, especially California. Two of the species are quite rare.

Three species:

- Rupertia hallii (Rydb.) J.W. Grimes
- Rupertia physodes (Douglas ex Hook.) J.W.Grimes
- Rupertia rigida (Parish) J.W.Grimes
