= Ladeania =

Scientific classification
- Kingdom: Plantae
- Clade: Tracheophytes
- Clade: Angiosperms
- Clade: Eudicots
- Clade: Rosids
- Order: Fabales
- Family: Fabaceae
- Genus: Ladeania; A.N.Egan & Reveal

Genus of plants

Ladeania is a genus of flowering plants belonging to the family Fabaceae. It is also in the Psoraleeae tribe.

Its native range is Western and Central USA. It is found in the states of Arizona, California, Colorado, Idaho, Kansas, Montana, Nebraska, Nevada, New Mexico, North Dakota, Oklahoma, Oregon, South Dakota, Texas, Utah, Washington and Wyoming.

The genus name of Ladeania is in honour of LaDean H. Egan (b. 1949), mother of Ashley Noel Egan (b. 1977), the author of the genus. It was first described and published in Novon Vol.19 on page 311 in 2009.

== Species ==
According to Kew;

- Ladeania juncea (Eastw.) Reveal & A.N.Egan
- Ladeania lanceolata (Pursh) Reveal & A.N.Egan
