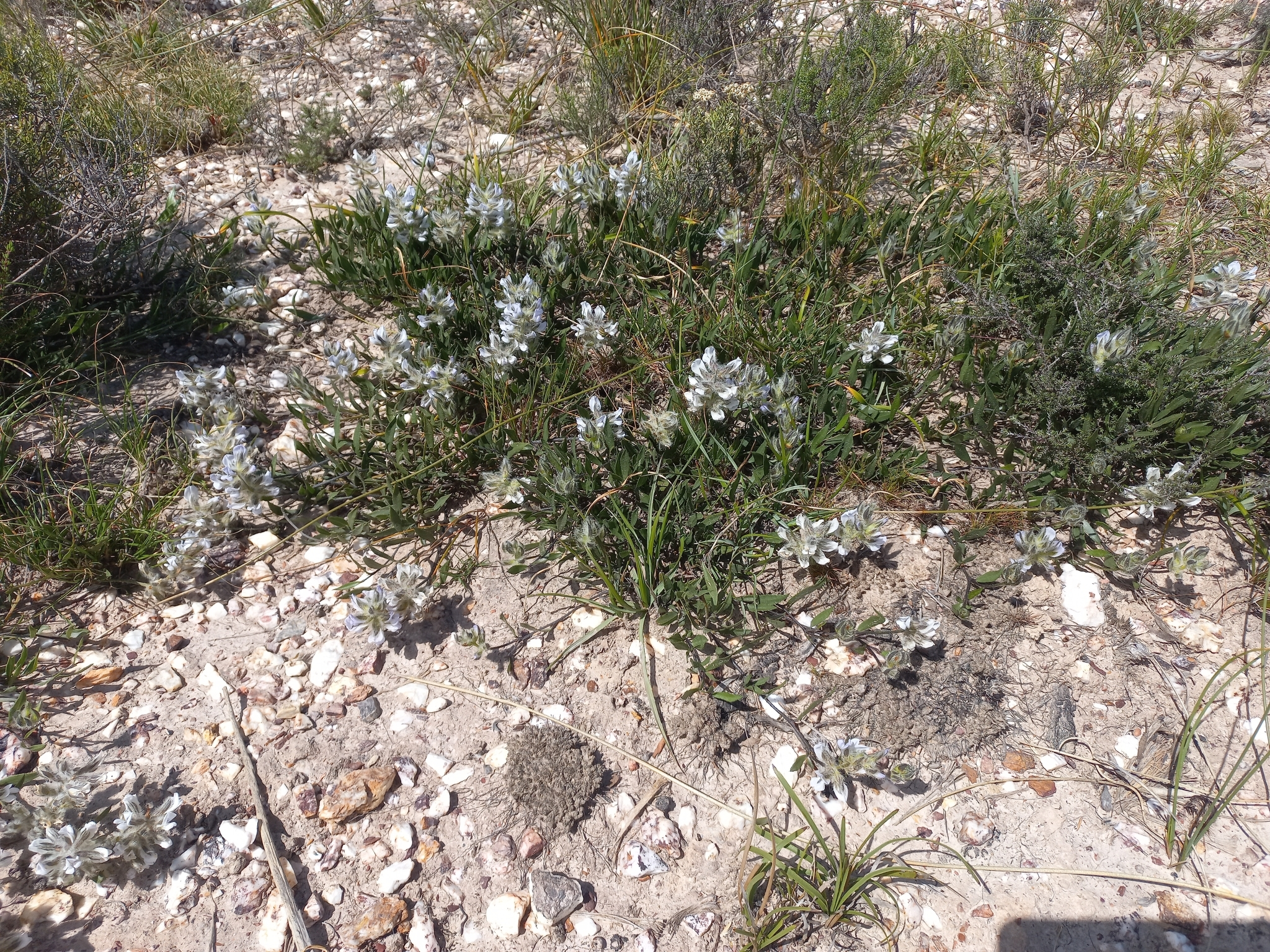

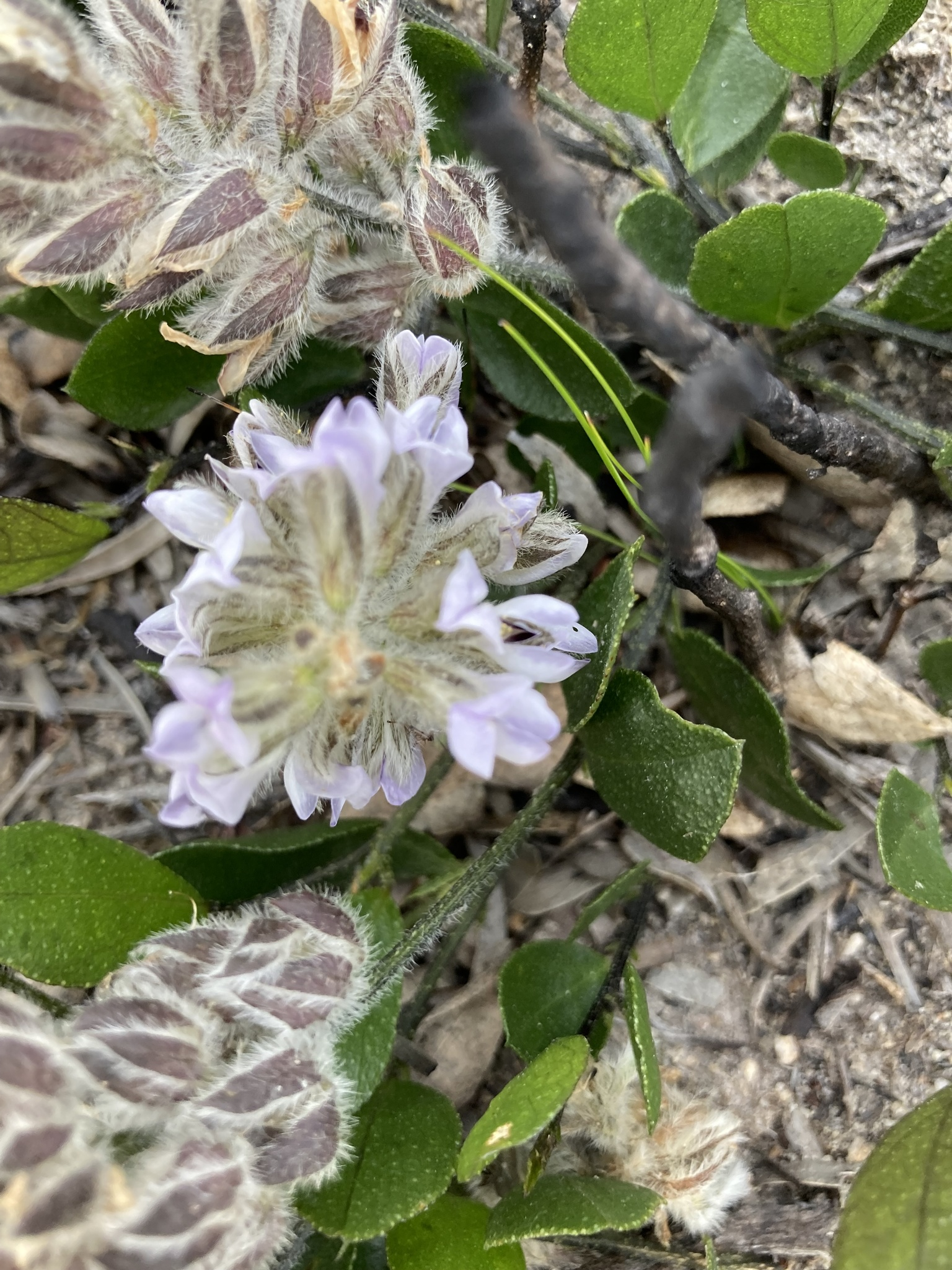

Conservation status
- Critically endangered (SANBI Red List)

Scientific classification
- Kingdom: Plantae
- Clade: Embryophytes
- Clade: Tracheophytes
- Clade: Spermatophytes
- Clade: Angiosperms
- Clade: Eudicots
- Clade: Rosids
- Order: Fabales
- Family: Fabaceae
- Subfamily: Faboideae
- Genus: Psoralea
- Species: P. lancifolia

Binomial name
- Psoralea lancifolia C.H.Stirt. & Muasya

Synonyms
- Otholobium lanceolatum C.H.Stirt. & Muasya; Psoralea lanceolata (C.H.Stirt. & Muasya) C.H.Stirt

= Psoralea lancifolia =

Species of flowering plant

Psoralea lancifolia is a small subshrub of up to 20 cm (7.9 in) high, that is assigned to the Pea family. It has up to 7 horizontal stems with raised tips, few hairless, alternately set leaves with only one leaflet and clusters of 15-27 white, pea-like flowers with a purple tip near the top of the short, seasonal shoots. It is endemic to one site near Caledon, South Africa. Flowers only appear in November and December within one year after a fire destroyed the vegetation.

== Description ==
Psoralea lancifolia is a small subshrub of up to 20 cm (7.9 in) high, with few leaves, that is assigned to the Pea family. Up to seven stems of 9–15 cm (3.5–5.9 in) long grow from a short thickened trunk, spread horizontally at their base but have rising tips. The plants regrow from the underground woody rootstock after fire destroys the above ground biomass. These stems occasionally branch from one of the lower axils. At the base of the leaf are two hairless, awl-shaped, pointy, ribbed, gland bearing stipules of 3–5 mm (0.12–0.20 in) long and 0.5–2 mm (0.020–0.079 in) wide, which is longer than the petioles. In contrast to most Otholobium species, the leaf only consists of one leaflet. The ancestral clover-like leaf can still be deduced from the fact that the petiole of about 2 mm (0.079 in) long is topped by a petiolule of about 1 mm (0.039 in) long that can be shed separately. It in turn carries the single leaflet that can also be shed separately. The first leaves to appear in the season are densely set with warts and smaller than later leaves. The hairless leaflet is elliptic, 2.5–3.6 cm (0.98–1.42 in) long and 0.6–1 cm (0.24–0.39 in) wide, with a wedge-shaped base, the edge set with glands, a pointy end, but the central vein is elongated beyond the leaf blade in a straight tip. The midvein is prominent on the underside of the leaflet while the secondary veins are somewhat raised on both surfaces but less conspicuous.

The oblong inflorescences emerge individually or in pairs in the axils of the youngest leaves of short, young shoots on 25–35 mm (0.98–1.38 in) long peduncles (about double the length of the subtending leaf) that are densely set with warts of about 0.2 mm (0.0079 in) high. The inflorescences themselves are 35–55 mm (1.4–2.2 in) long, and carry between 5 and 9 clusters of three flowers each that are borne on 2–4 mm (0.079–0.157 in) long pedicels. Each flower cluster is subtended by a fan-shaped to broadly oval-oblong, hairy bract, that carries glands and is eventually shed. The flowers are 8–10 mm (0.31–0.39 in) long, and initially are each subtended by a narrowly lance- to line-shaped bract of about 3 mm (0.12 in) long that is eventually shed. The calyx is merged in a bell-shaped tube of 2–3 mm (0.079–0.118 in) long but ends in five teeth. Its outer surface is covered in spreading, white 1.5–2 mm (0.059–0.079 in) long hairs and many small glands, but hairless on the inside. All teeth have a pointy tip. The tooth at the bottom of the flower is dark green, much longer (10–11 mm (0.39–0.43 in)) and wider (2–2.5 mm (0.079–0.098 in)) than the other four. These other teeth are pale yellowish green in colour. The two teeth adjoining the standard are sickle-shaped and fused together for about a third of their length, and about as long as the teeth to the sides of the flower. As in most Faboideae, the corolla is zygomorph, forms a specialized structure and consists of five free, white petals. The upper petal, called the banner or standard, is white to pale blue, about 13 mm (0.51 in) long and 8–9 mm (0.31–0.35 in), inverted egg-shaped, but oblong when the blade is curved backwards. The blade of the standard is extending down into a narrowed part called claw of about 2 mm (0.079 in) long. The two side petals called wings are shaped like a pruning knife, curving up relative to the keel, 10–12 mm (0.39–0.47 in) long and 3–4 mm (0.12–0.16 in) wide. The blade of the wing is adorned with an area of ridges and has one lobe or auricle facing the base. The claw of the wing is about 3 mm (0.12 in) long. The wing petals envelop and are very lightly attached to the keel. The two keel petals are fused at the bottom and form a boot-like structure. The keel petals are white with a purple blotch at the tip, about 9 mm (0.35 in) long and 2.5–3 mm (0.098–0.118 in) and extend towards the base in a narrowed claw of about 4 mm (0.16 in) long. The keel envelops a hollow, open tube of about 8 mm (0.31 in) long, made up of nine merged filaments and one free stamen. The anthers are all equal and approximately 0.3 mm (0.012 in) long. Largely hidden in this androecium is an approximately 8 mm (0.31 in) long pistil, including at its base a gynophore of about 1 mm (0.039 in) long that carries the softly hairy ovary of 1.8–2 mm (0.071–0.079 in) long. At the tip, the ovary extends into a sparsely hairy, forward sloping style that strongly widens at the place where it curves upwards 2.5–2.8 mm (0.098–0.110 in) from its end. The style is topped by a stigma with few brushlike hairs. Fruits and seeds were unknown at the time of the description of this species.

=== Differences with related species ===
Psoralea lancifolia can be distinguished from P. rotundifolia, which has inverted egg-shaped leaflets of 10–18 mm wide with minute teeth along its edge and the midvein only slightly emerging beyond the tip (not elliptic leaflets of 6–10 mm wide with smooth margins and a conspicuously extended midvein), club-shaped stipules (not awl-shaped), the inflorescences consist of 3–5 pairs or triplets of flowers (not 5–9 triplets), and the calyx teeth are approximately equally long (not very unequal teeth). P. dreweae and P. thomii are clump-forming subshrubs that are densely set with leaves and have distinctly ridged herbaceous stems without dot-like glands, and pale to reddish purple flowers (not open, sparsely leaved woody subshrubs, with branches covered in warts or dots but without ridges, and white flowers with a purple keel tip). P. zeyheri in which the leaves that are higher on the stems have 3 leaflets (not all leaves with just one leaflet), carries spikes that consist of 25-30 sets of 3 flowers, on a stalk that is 4-5 times longer than the subtending leaf (not 5-9 triplets on an inflorescence stalk that is only double the length of the leaf).

== Taxonomy ==
As far as known, this species was first noticed in 1951 by South African botanist and profuse plant collector Elsie Elizabeth Esterhuysen. Charles Stirton and A. Muthama Muasya considered it sufficiently different from its relatives, described it in 2017, and called it Otholobium lanceolatum. The name of the genus Otholobium is a combination of the Greek words ὠθέω (ōthéō) meaning to push and λοβός (lobos) meaning pod, which Stirton selected because its fruit seems to be pushed out of the calyx. The species name lanceolatum means having the form of a lance head.

== Conservation, distribution and ecology ==
Psoralea lancifolia is considered to be a critically endangered species because it has only been found in one location, in the foothills north of Shaw's Mountain, near Caledon in the Western Cape province of South Africa, which is a municipal commonage. Most of its habitat was lost to wheat cultivation. Currently, its habitat is under threat due to livestock grazing and competition by invasive plants such as Eucalyptus, Hakea and Acacia species, and may ultimately be destroyed by possible future housing or agricultural development. The species is found in the border zone between eroded sandstone and shale on somewhat semi-dry, clayey but primarily stony slopes at an altitude of 100–200 m (330–660 ft). Flowers have only been found in the year following a fire and appear in November and December. Although flowering is profuse, few seeds develop.
