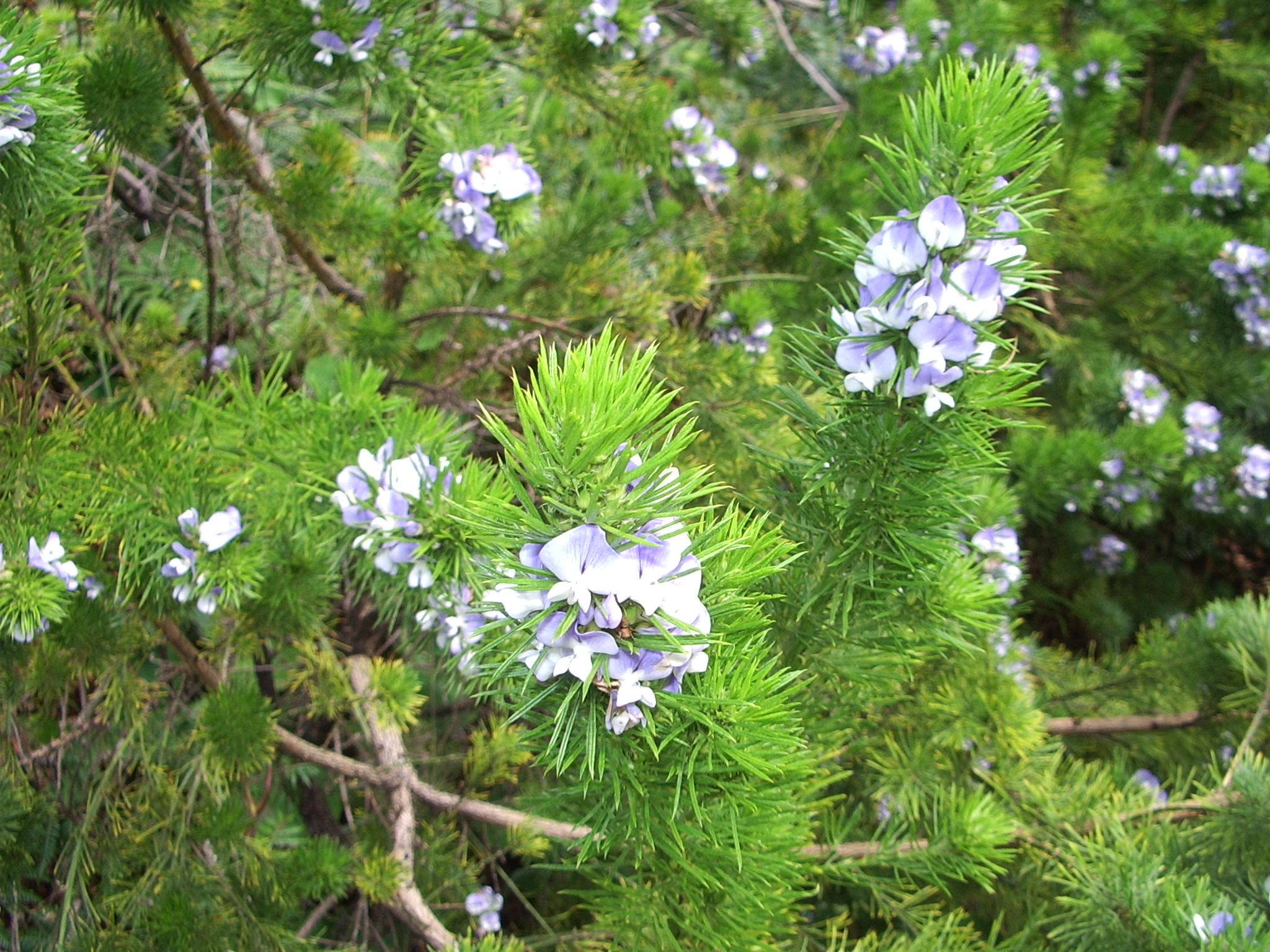
- Psoralea pinnata

Scientific classification
- Kingdom: Plantae
- Clade: Tracheophytes
- Clade: Angiosperms
- Clade: Eudicots
- Clade: Rosids
- Order: Fabales
- Family: Fabaceae
- Subfamily: Faboideae
- Clade: Meso-Papilionoideae
- Clade: Non-protein amino acid-accumulating clade
- Clade: Millettioids
- Tribe: Psoraleeae; Benth.

Genera
- See text

= Psoraleeae =

Tribe of legumes

The tribe Psoraleeae is one of the subdivisions of the plant family Fabaceae. Recent phylogenetics has this tribe nested within tribe Phaseoleae.

== Genera ==
Psoraleeae comprises the following genera:

- Bituminaria Heist. ex Fabr.
- Cullen Medik.
- Grimolobium A.N.Egan, C.H.Stirt. & A.Bello
- Hoita Rydb.
- Kartalinia Brullo, C.Brullo, Cambria, Acar, Salmeri & Giusso
- Ladeania A. N. Egan & Reveal
- Orbexilum Raf.
- Otholobium C. H. Stirt.
- Pediomelum Rydb.
- Psoralea L.
- Rupertia J. W. Grimes

== Systematics ==
Modern molecular phylogenetics suggest the following relationships:

- - Phaseoleae (outgroup)
  - Psoraleeae
    - - Otholobium (African species)
      - Psoralea
    - - Cullen
      - - Bituminaria
        - - Hoita
          - - - Otholobium (South American species)
              - Orbexilum
            - - - Ladeania
                - Rupertia
              - Pediomelum
