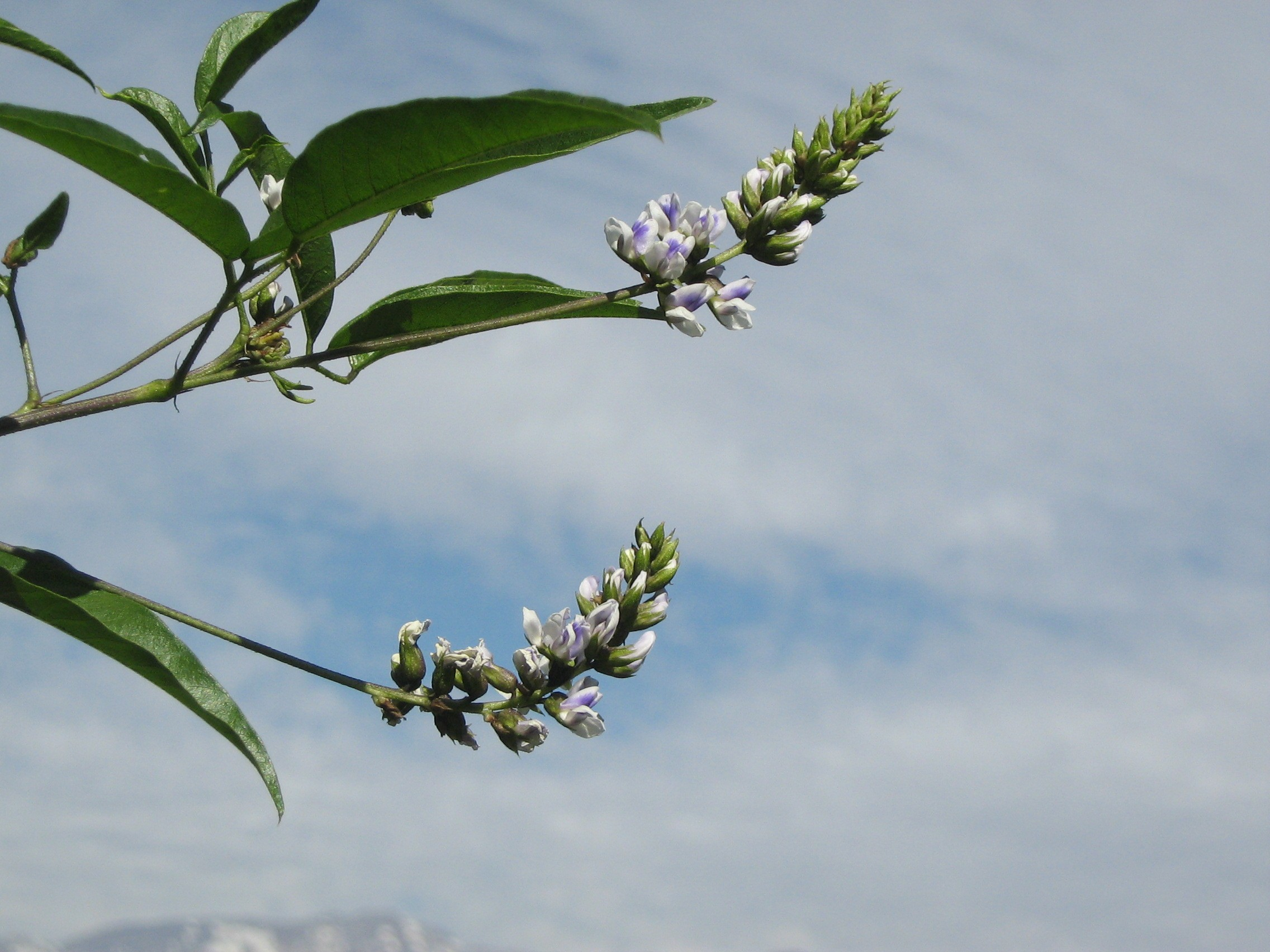

Scientific classification
- Kingdom: Plantae
- Clade: Embryophytes
- Clade: Tracheophytes
- Clade: Spermatophytes
- Clade: Angiosperms
- Clade: Eudicots
- Clade: Rosids
- Order: Fabales
- Family: Fabaceae
- Subfamily: Faboideae
- Genus: Grimolobium
- Species: G. glandulosum

Binomial name
- Grimolobium glandulosum (L.) A.N.Egan & C.H.Stirt.

Synonyms
- Hoita glandulosa (L.) Rydb.; Lotodes glandulosum (L.) Kuntze; Otholobium glandulosum (L.) J.W.Grimes; Psoralea glandulosa L.

= Grimolobium glandulosum =

Species of legume

Grimolobium glandulosum is a species of flowering plant in the family Fabaceae. It is a shrub or tree native to Peru, Bolivia, and central and southern Chile in South America.

Psoralea glandulosa was first described by Carl Linnaeus and published in Species Plantarum 2: 1075. 1763. In 1990 J. W. Grimes placed the species in genus Otholobium as O. glandulosum. In 2024 Ashley Egan et al. concluded that the Otholobium species native to the Americas formed a distinct clade from the African species, and placed O. glandulosum in the newly described genus Grimolobium as G. glandulosum.

== Bibliography ==
- Bouton, L. (1857). Trans. Roy. Soc. Arts Mauritius n. s. 1: 1–177 Medicinal plants...
- List Based Record (1986). U.S. Soil Conservation Service.
- Marticorena, C., y M. Quezada (1985). Gayana, Bot. 42: 1–157 Catálogo de la flora vascular de Chile.
