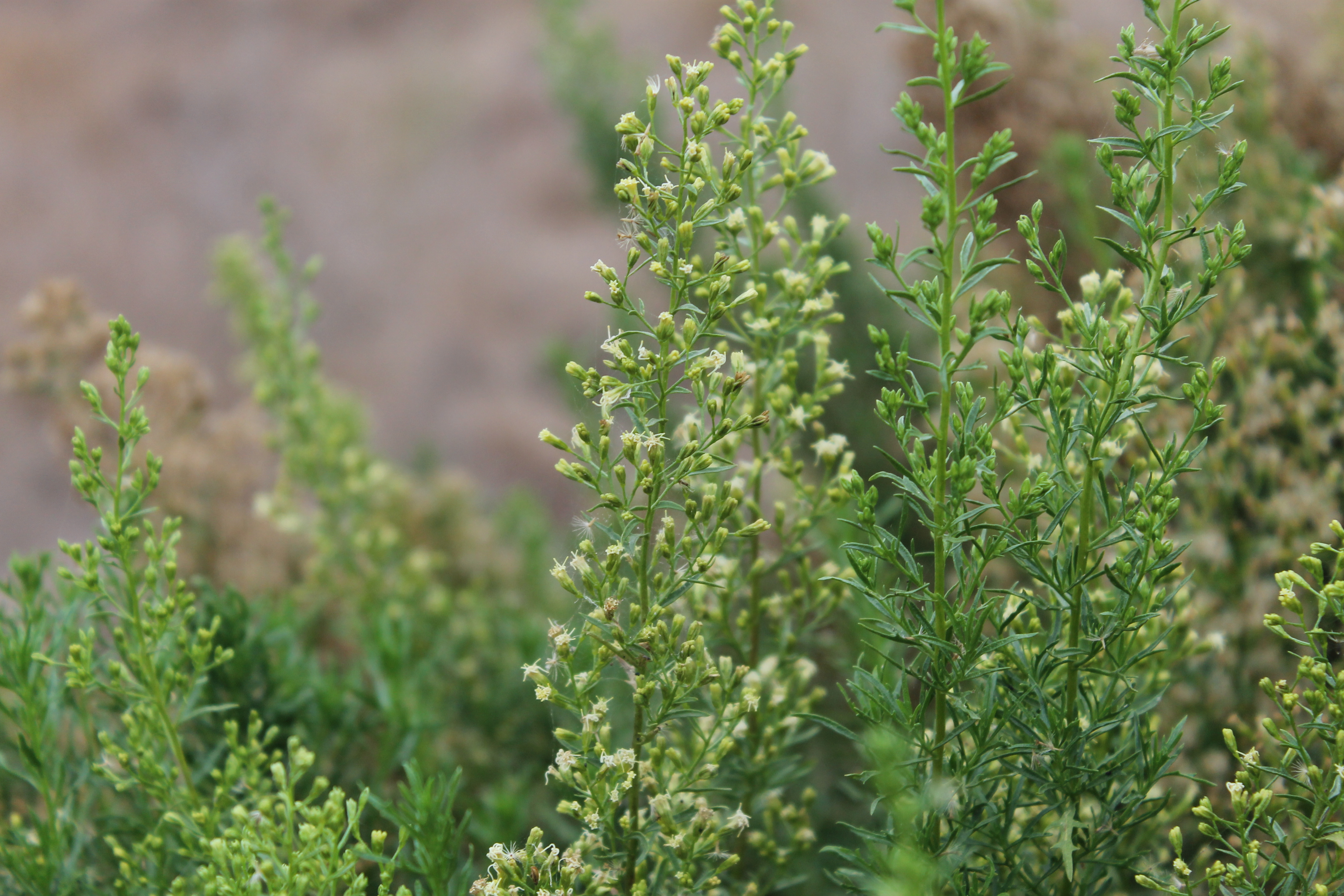
- Ophryosporus paradoxus

Scientific classification
- Kingdom: Plantae
- Clade: Embryophytes
- Clade: Tracheophytes
- Clade: Angiosperms
- Clade: Eudicots
- Clade: Asterids
- Order: Asterales
- Family: Asteraceae
- Subfamily: Asteroideae
- Tribe: Eupatorieae
- Genus: Ophryosporus; Meyen

Type species
- Ophryosporus triangularis Meyen

Synonyms
- Trychinolepis B.L.Rob.; Piqueria sect. Artemisioides DC.

= Ophryosporus =

Genus of flowering plants

Ophryosporus is a genus of South American flowering plants in the tribe Eupatorieae within the family Asteraceae.

Species

- Ophryosporus angustifolius - Bolivia
- Ophryosporus anomalus - Tacna, Antofagasta, Tarapacá (Chile)
- Ophryosporus apricus - Peru
- Ophryosporus axilliflorus - Bolivia, north-western Argentina
- Ophryosporus bipinnatifidus - Peru
- Ophryosporus burkartii - Jujuy
- Ophryosporus carchiensis - Ecuador
- Ophryosporus charua - north-western Argentina
- Ophryosporus chilca - Ecuador, Peru
- Ophryosporus cumingii - Bolivia
- Ophryosporus densiflorus - Ecuador
- Ophryosporus eleutherantherus - Bolivia, Peru
- Ophryosporus ferreyrii - Peru
- Ophryosporus floribundus - Lima, Antofagasta
- Ophryosporus freyreysii - Brazil
- Ophryosporus galioides - Ecuador, Peru
- Ophryosporus heptanthus - Ecuador, Peru, Bolivia
- Ophryosporus hoppii - Arequipa, Antofagasta, Tarapacá
- Ophryosporus johnstonii - Atacama
- Ophryosporus kuntzei - Bolivia
- Ophryosporus laxiflorus - Minas Gerais, Paraná
- Ophryosporus lorentzii - Jujuy, Salta, Tucuman
- Ophryosporus macbridei - Ancash, Huánuco
- Ophryosporus macrodon - Bolivia, Jujuy, Salta, Tucuman
- Ophryosporus mandonii
- Ophryosporus marchii - Peru - Contumaza
- Ophryosporus mathewsii - Peru
- Ophryosporus organensis - Rio de Janeiro
- Ophryosporus ovatifolius - Brazil
- Ophryosporus ovatus - Peruvian Amazonas, Cajamarca
- Ophryosporus paradoxus - Chile
- Ophryosporus peruvianus - Ecuador, Peru
- Ophryosporus pinifolius - Lima, Huancavelica, Huánuco, Tarapacá
- Ophryosporus piquerioides - Bolivia, Peru, Argentina
- Ophryosporus pubescens - Peru
- Ophryosporus regnellii - Brazil
- Ophryosporus sagasteguii - Peru
- Ophryosporus serratifolius - Colombia, Ecuador, Peru
- Ophryosporus sodiroi - Ecuador, Peru
- Ophryosporus steinbachii - Bolivia
- Ophryosporus triangularis - Chile
- Ophryosporus venosissimus - Bolivia

formerly included

Several once considered part of Ophryosporus now regarded as better suited to other genera: Decachaeta Koanophyllon Mikania Stomatanthes
