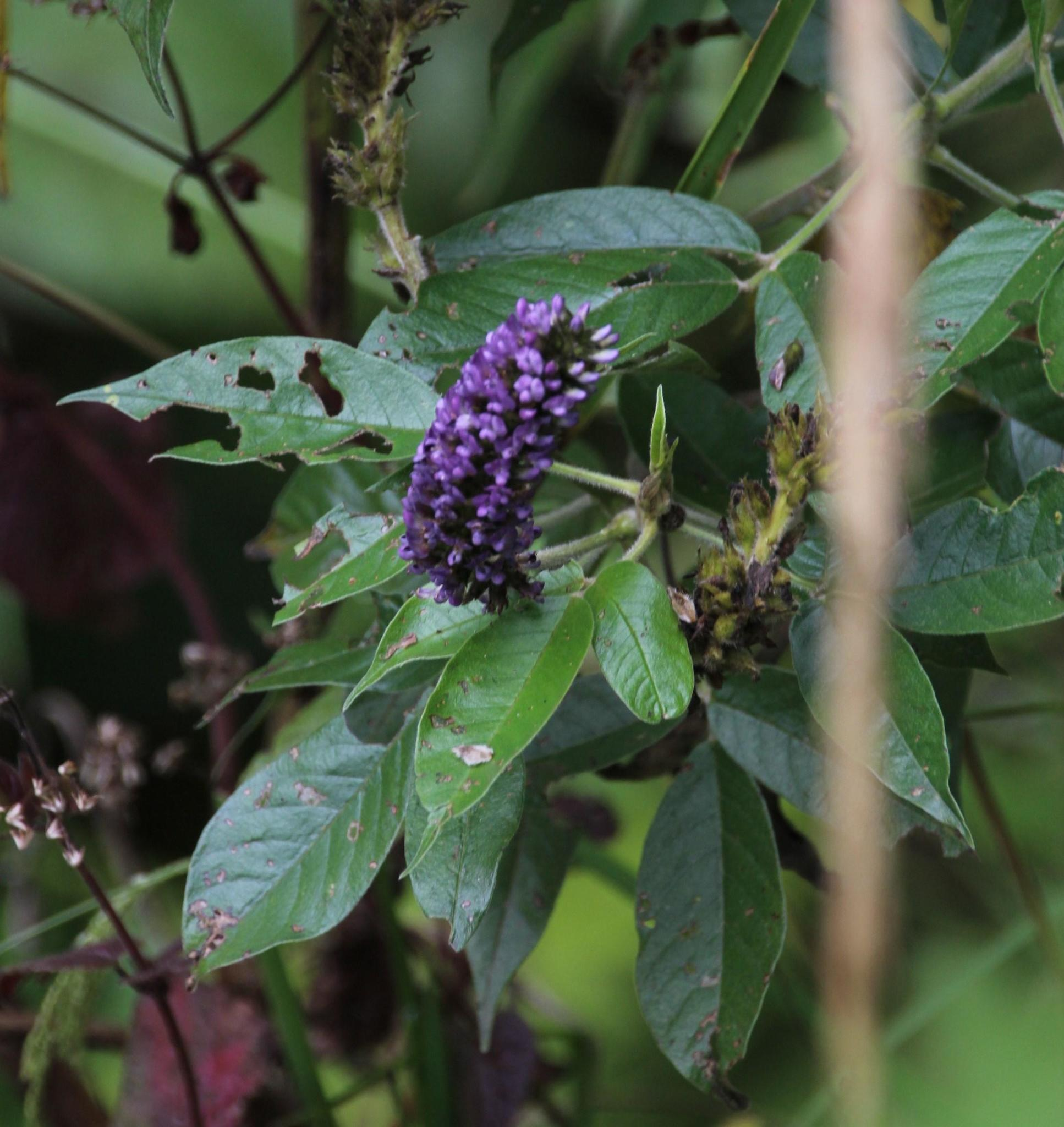

Scientific classification
- Kingdom: Plantae
- Clade: Tracheophytes
- Clade: Angiosperms
- Clade: Eudicots
- Clade: Rosids
- Order: Fabales
- Family: Fabaceae
- Subfamily: Faboideae
- Genus: Grimolobium
- Species: G. pubescens

Binomial name
- Grimolobium pubescens (Poir.) A.N.Egan & C.H.Stirt.

Synonyms
- List: Hoita hirsuta Rusby; Hoita versicolor Rusby; Lotodes marginatum (Meyen) Kuntze; Otholobium pubescens (Poir.) J.W.Grimes; Psoralea featherstonei J.F.Macbr.; Psoralea lasiostachys Vogel; Psoralea lasiostachys var. potens (J.F.Macbr.) J.F.Macbr.; Psoralea marginata Meyen; Psoralea potens J.F.Macbr.; Psoralea pubescens Poir.; Psoralea pubescens var. lasiostachys (Vogel) J.F.Macbr.; Psoralea pubescens var. potens (J.F.Macbr.) J.F.Macbr.; Psoralea remotiflora J.F.Macbr.; Psoralea yurensis Rusby

= Grimolobium pubescens =

Species of legume

Grimolobium pubescens, synonyms including Otholobium pubescens, is a plant species native to Bolivia, Peru and North Chile. It has been used in traditional medicine in Peru. The plant contains the chemical compound bakuchiol, which has been studied in a mouse model for its potential antihyperglycemic effects.

== Taxonomy ==
The species was first described as Psoralea pubescens by Jean Louis Marie Poiret in 1804. In a revision of the tribe Psoraleeae in 1990, the species was one of those from South America placed in the genus Ortholobium. Molecular phylogenetic evidence led to the African species of Ortholobium being sunk back into Psoralea, and in 2024 the South American species, including G. pubescens, being moved to a new genus Grimolobium.
