= Drupanol =

Chemical compound

Identifiers
- IUPAC name: 4-(3-Ethenyl-3,6-dimethyl-1-methylene-5-heptenyl)phenol
- CAS Number: 42041-17-8 ((+)-isomer)
- PubChem CID: 129685892
- ChemSpider: 6702812
- UNII: U4JU7QTN2Q

Chemical and physical data
- Formula: C_{18}H_{24}O
- Molar mass: 256.389 g·mol^{−1}
- 3D model (JSmol): Interactive image
- SMILES: CC(C)=CCC(C)(CC(=C)C1=CC=C(O)C=C1)C=C
- InChI: InChI=1/C18H24O/c1-6-18(5,12-11-14(2)3)13-15(4)16-7-9-17(19)10-8-16/h6-11,19H,1,4,12-13H2,2-3,5H3; Key:CRWULAJEYWVGOC-UHFFFAOYNA-N

Drupanol is a naturally occurring phenol that has been isolated from the seeds of Psoralea drupaceae. Although drupanol is sometimes said to be the same compound as bakuchiol, the two compounds are in fact distinct; they have the same molecular formula and weight but different chemical structures and hence are structural isomers. Bakuchiol has been found to possess antiandrogenic activity in vitro.
