= Psoralea dreweae =

Conservation status
- Vulnerable (SANBI Red List)

Scientific classification
- Kingdom: Plantae
- Clade: Embryophytes
- Clade: Tracheophytes
- Clade: Angiosperms
- Clade: Eudicots
- Clade: Rosids
- Order: Fabales
- Family: Fabaceae
- Subfamily: Faboideae
- Genus: Psoralea
- Species: P. dreweae

Binomial name
- Psoralea dreweae (C.H.Stirt. & Muasya) C.H.Stirt.

Synonyms
- Otholobium dreweae C.H.Stirt. & Muasya

Species of plant endemic to South Africa

Psoralea dreweae is an upright shrublet assigned to the Pea family of about 15 cm (5.9 in) high, that appears after the vegetation burned down from the underground rootstock and forms mat-like clumps of hardly branching, leafy stems. The stems are set with stiff, entire, alternate leaves with a single leaflet and heads consisting of 12-18 initially dark pink, later white, pea-like flowers with a white nectar guide on a peduncle as long as the leaves at the end of the stem. This species is an endemic of the Kleinrivier Mountains in the Western Cape province of South Africa. It mostly flowers in November.

== Description ==
Psoralea dreweae is a small, largely herbaceous subshrub, without dot-like glands, that regrows from an underground rootstock after a fire destroyed the vegetation and forms large, often mat-like clumps. It's erect, distinctly ridged and scarcely branching, densely leafy stems are up to 15 cm (5.9 in) long. At the base of the stiff, alternately set leaves are two awl-shaped stipules of 6–9 mm (0.24–0.35 in) long and 2–2.5 mm (0.079–0.098 in) wide, with 5-6 veins, hairless except for a rough margin. In contrast to most Otholobium species, the leaf only consists of one leaflet. The ancestral clover-like leaf can still be deduced from the fact that the petiole of 4–5 mm (0.16–0.20 in) long is topped by a petiolule of about 1 mm (0.039 in) long that can be shed separately. It in turn carries the leaflet that can also be shed separately. The first leaflets to appear are more or less circular and smaller than those higher up the stem. These later leaflets are elliptic in shape, 3–4 cm (1.2–1.6 in) long and 1–1.6 cm (0.39–0.63 in) wide, with a wedge-shaped base, a sharp, elongated, rigid tip, a rough margin, and mostly hairy on the veins.

The flowers are combined in compact and rounded inflorescences of 25–30 mm (0.98–1.18 in) long, which grow individually at the tip of the shoots on a peduncle of 25–30 mm long, which is about as long as the leaflets, and consist of 4-6 clusters of three flowers, each triplet subtended by a lance-shaped, pointy bract of 10–12 mm (0.39–0.47 in) long and 7–9 mm (0.28–0.35 in) wide. A persistent bract subtends each individual flower. The calyx has thick, netted veins, is covered on the outside by very short erect white hairs and long black hairs and hairless on the inside. It is merged at the base into a 4 mm (0.16 in) long tube and has five equally long teeth of 8–10 mm (0.31–0.39 in). The upper four teeth are all lance-shaped and 3–4 mm (0.12–0.16 in) wide, the one subtending the keel is folded like a boat, 15–16 mm (0.59–0.63 in) long and 5.5–6 mm (0.22–0.24 in) wide.

As in most Faboideae, the corolla is zygomorph, forms a specialized structure and consists of 5 free, initially dark pink petals that later fade to white. The upper petal, called the banner or standard, curves backwards, is 16–17 mm (0.63–0.67 in) long and 13–14 mm (0.51–0.55 in) wide, hairless, has a narrow part at its base called the claw of approximately 2 mm (0.079 in) long and a vaguely delimited white spot that functions as a nectar guide. It is broadly oval in shape, without appendages but with prominent auricles. The side petals, called wings, are longer than keel at 16–17 mm (0.63–0.67 in) long and approximately 7 mm (0.28 in) wide, spade-shaped, curving up, with an auricle, and a 5 mm (0.20 in) long claw at the base, and is sculptured with 50-60 ridges midlength above the middle. The 2 lower petals that stick together at the underside and are jointly called the keel, consist of approximately 5 mm (0.20 in) long claws at the base and about 12 mm (0.47 in) long and 4 mm (0.16 in) wide blades that have a rounded tip. The keel envelops a hollow, open tube of about 11 mm (0.43 in) long, made up of 9 merged filaments and 1 free stamen, which are topped by 10 equal-shaped anthers of 0.7–0.8 mm (0.028–0.031 in) long. Largely hidden in this androecium is a 12–13 mm (0.47–0.51 in) long pistil, including the softly hairy ovary of about 3 mm (0.12 in) long at its base, a style that is thickened at the place where it curves upward about 4 mm from its end, hairy in its horizontal part and hairless in the vertical part. The pistil it topped by a pinhead shaped stigma covered with brush-like hairs. The pistil later develops into the distinctly ribbed, 5–5.5 mm (0.20–0.22 in) long and 3–3.5 mm (0.12–0.14 in) thick pod that has a papery texture and a covering of fine, soft, white hairs, and contains just one seed. The seed is about 4 mm (0.16 in) long and 2.5 mm (0.098 in) long, pale brown in colour with small purple blotches near the area where it was attached.

=== Differences with related species ===
Psoralea dreweae can be distinguished from P. thomii that is a semi-erect or decumbent (not erect) plant with initially densely hairy (not sparsely hairy), pliable (not stiff) leaves, that each have at their base 2 softly hairy, broadly oval lance-shaped stipules with a pointy tip (not hairless and awl-shaped), each triplet of flowers is subtended by a lance-shaped bract that is shed quickly (not egg-shaped and persistent), and its petals are light to deep purple in colour (not dark pink that fades to white).

O. lanceolatum and P. rotundifolia are woody shrublets with cylindrical stems covered with dot-like glands and distantly set leaves (not densely leafy with ridged, herbaceous stems without dots), with pale mauve or white petals (not light to deep purple).

P. zeyheri in which the leaves that are higher on the stems have 3 leaflets (not all leaves with just one leaflet), carries spikes that consist of 25–30 sets of 3 flowers, on a stalk that is 4–5 times longer than the subtending leaf (not 3–9 triplets on an inflorescence stalk just 1–2 times longer).

== Taxonomy ==
As far as known, Priscilla B. Drewe first collected this species for science in November 1986 in the Fernkloof Nature Reserve. Charles Stirton and A. Muthama Muasya together described this species in 2017, and called it Otholobium dreweae. The name of the genus Otholobium is a combination of the Greek words ὠθέω (ōthéō) meaning to push and λοβός (lobos) meaning pod, which Stirton selected because its fruit seems to be pushed out of the calyx. The species was named to honor Mrs Drewe, curator of the Hermanus Herbarium, for her part in the inventory of the plants in the surroundings of Hermanus. In 2022 Stirton concluded that Otholobium was a synonym of Psoralea, and renamed the species P. dreweae.

== Conservation, distribution, habitat and ecology ==
Psoralea dreweae is considered to be a vulnerable species, which is at risk due to an invasion of alien species in the area. It is only known from two locations in the Kleinrivier Mountains near Hermanus at approximately 400 m (1,300 ft) elevation that are about 1 km (0.6 mi) apart. Here it forms dense clumps growing in full sun on bands of shale in a vegetation type called mountain fynbos. The species resprouts from an underground rootstock after a fire destroyed the local vegetation, and it flowers within the first year and occasionally in the subsequent year, around November. It produces only few seeds per plant.
