= Grimolobium holosericeum =

Conservation status
- Endangered (IUCN 3.1)

Scientific classification
- Kingdom: Plantae
- Clade: Embryophytes
- Clade: Tracheophytes
- Clade: Spermatophytes
- Clade: Angiosperms
- Clade: Eudicots
- Clade: Rosids
- Order: Fabales
- Family: Fabaceae
- Subfamily: Faboideae
- Genus: Grimolobium
- Species: G. holosericeum

Binomial name
- Grimolobium holosericeum (Barneby) A.N.Egan & C.H.Stirt.

Synonyms
- Otholobium holosericeum (Barneby) J.W.Grimes; Psoralea holosericea Barneby

Species of legume

Grimolobium holosericeum is a species of legume in the family Fabaceae. It is found only in Ecuador. Its natural habitat is subtropical or tropical moist montane forests.
