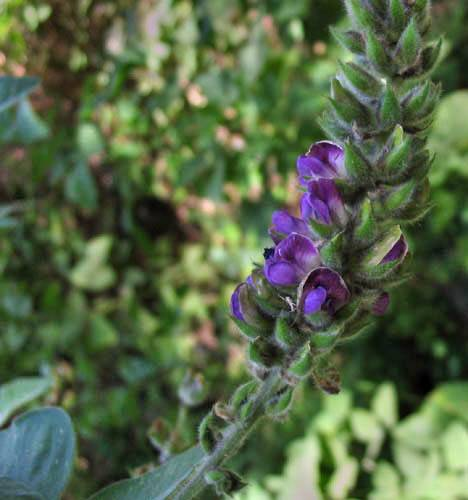
- Hoita macrostachya

Scientific classification
- Kingdom: Plantae
- Clade: Tracheophytes
- Clade: Angiosperms
- Clade: Eudicots
- Clade: Rosids
- Order: Fabales
- Family: Fabaceae
- Subfamily: Faboideae
- Tribe: Psoraleeae
- Genus: Hoita; Rydb.

Species
- Hoita macrostachya - leatherroot scurfpea; Hoita orbicularis - roundleaf scurfpea; Hoita strobilina- Loma Prieta scurfpea

= Hoita =

Genus of legumes

Hoita is a small genus of legumes containing three species. They bear attractive purple or fuchsia flowers in large inflorescences similar to those of kudzu. They are known commonly as scurfpeas or leather-roots and are closely related to the psoraleas. They are found almost exclusively in California.
