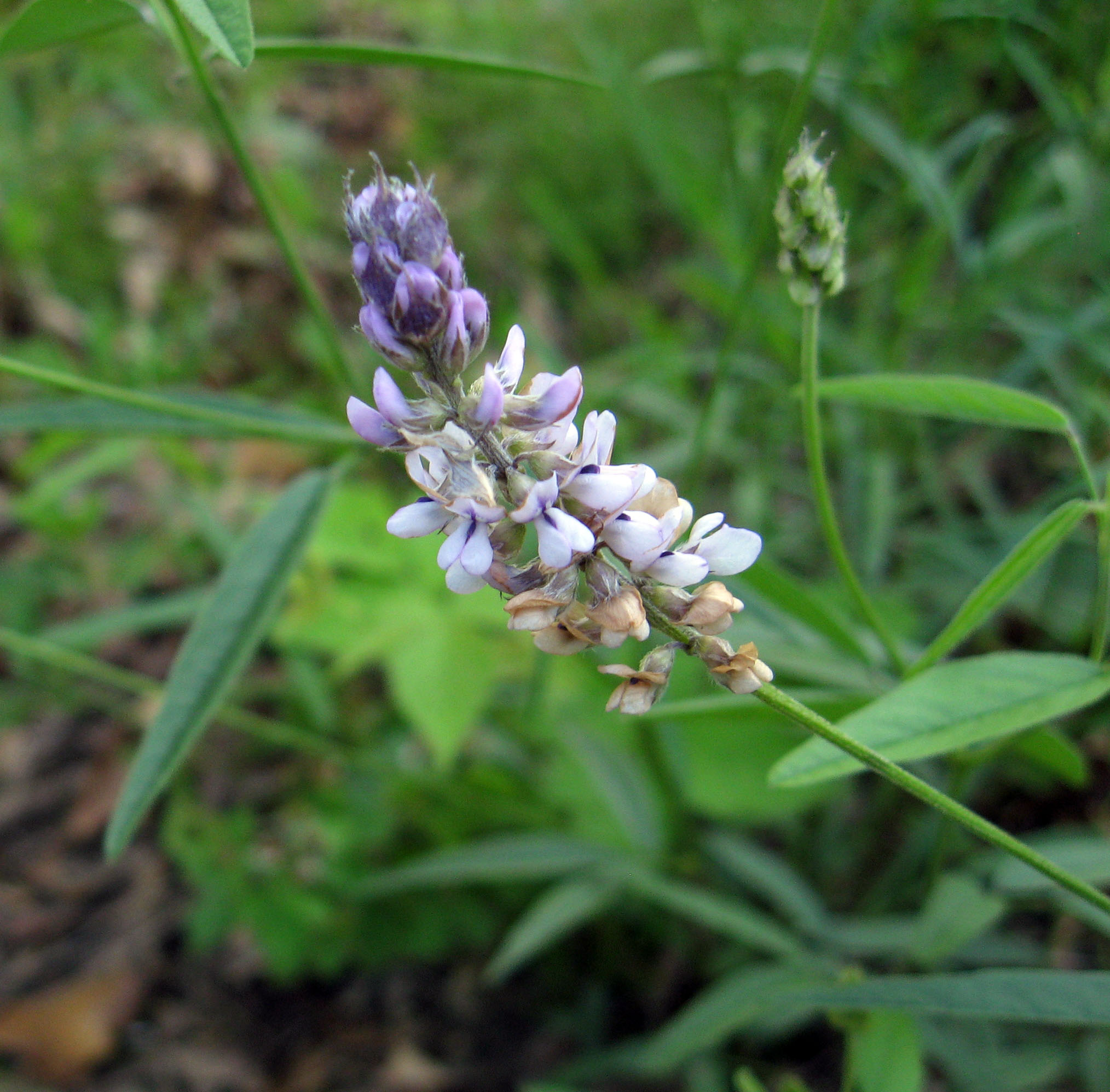
- Orbexilum pedunculatum

Scientific classification
- Kingdom: Plantae
- Clade: Tracheophytes
- Clade: Angiosperms
- Clade: Eudicots
- Clade: Rosids
- Order: Fabales
- Family: Fabaceae
- Subfamily: Faboideae
- Tribe: Psoraleeae
- Genus: Orbexilum; Raf. (1832)

Species
- See text

Synonyms
- Rhytidomene Rydb. (1919)

= Orbexilum =

Genus of plants

Orbexilum, commonly called leather-root, is a genus of flowering plants in the legume family (Fabaceae). They are native to North America, where they are found in the United States and Mexico, south to Chiapas.

This genus can be distinguished from other genera in the Psoraleeae by its "thick glabrous pod walls that are distinctively rugose and by [a] calyx that is scarcely accrescent."

== Taxonomy ==
The genus was described by Constantine Samuel Rafinesque in 1832, with the type species O. latifolia, moved from Psoralea. (O. latifolia is now considered a synonym of O. onobrychis.) Rafinesque differentiated Orbexilum from Psoralea largely on the basis of features of the calyx.

=== Species ===
Orbexilum comprises the following species:

- Orbexilum chiapasanum B.L.Turner
- Orbexilum lupinellus (Michx.) Isely (Note: The specific epithet is sometimes incorrectly spelled lupinellum, but is a noun in apposition, so is correctly spelled lupinellus.)
- †Orbexilum macrophyllum (Rowlee) Rydb. – bigleaf scurfpea
- Orbexilum melanocarpum (Benth.) Rydb.
- Orbexilum oliganthum (Brandegee) B.L.Turner
- Orbexilum onobrychis (Nutt.) Rydb.
- Orbexilum pedunculatum (Mill.) Rydb.
- Orbexilum psoralioides (Walter) Vincent, syn. Orbexilum gracile (Torr. & A.Gray) B.L.Turner
- Orbexilum simplex (Nutt. ex Torr. & A.Gray) Rydb.
- †Orbexilum stipulatum (Torr. & A.Gray) Rydb.
- Orbexilum virgatum (Nutt.) Rydb.
