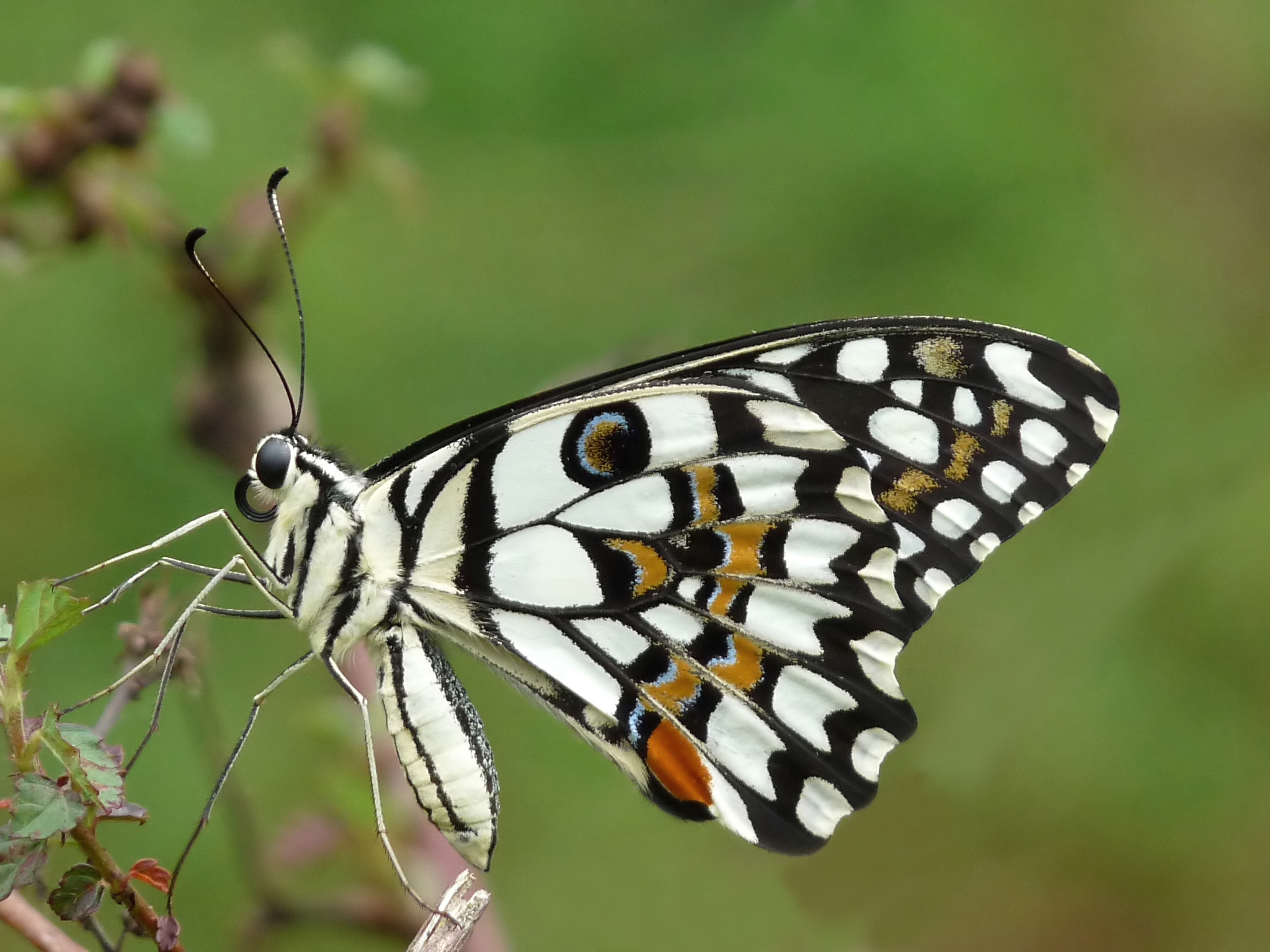
- underside
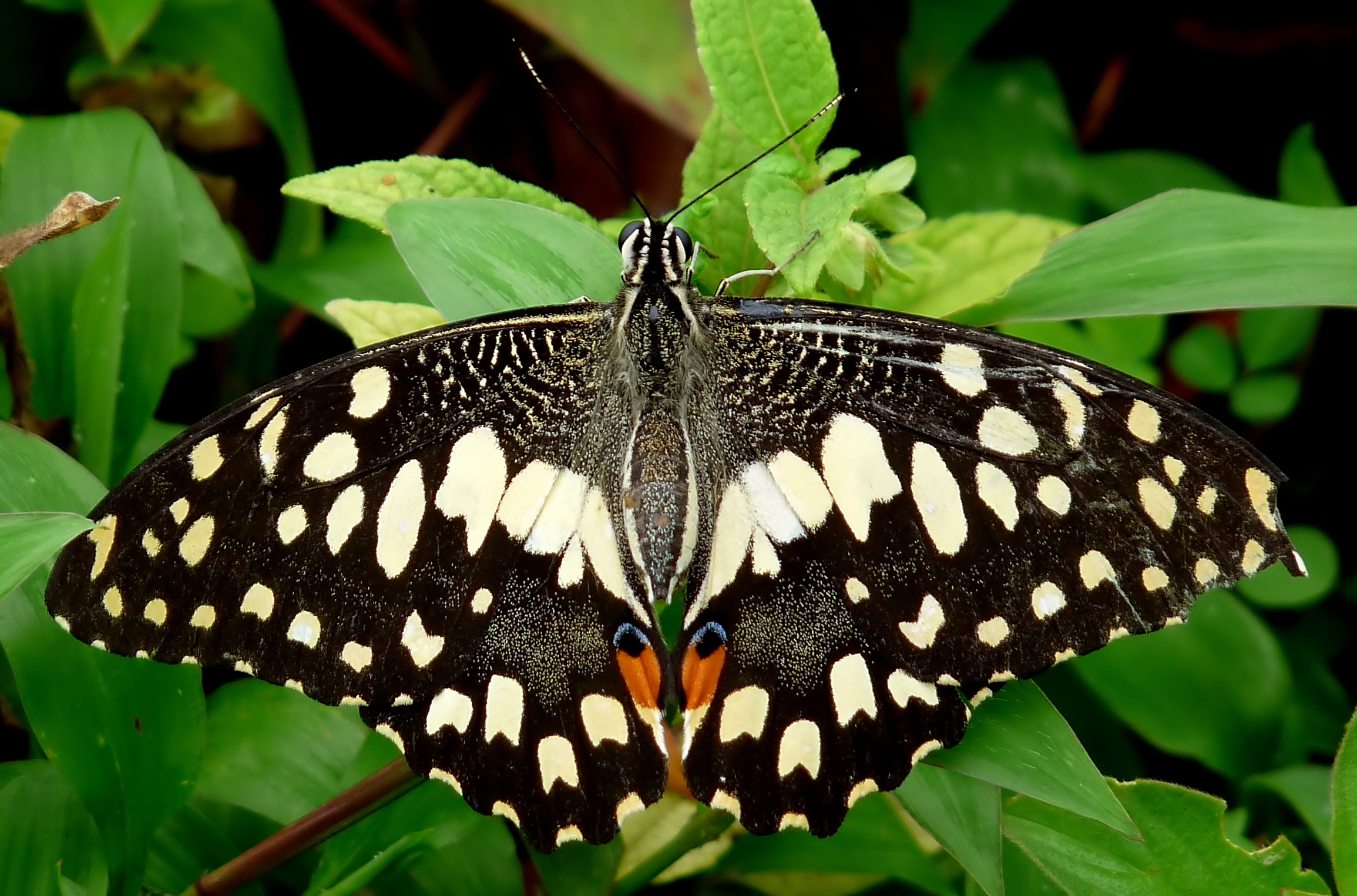
- Dorsal view

Scientific classification
- Kingdom: Animalia
- Phylum: Arthropoda
- Clade: Pancrustacea
- Class: Insecta
- Order: Lepidoptera
- Family: Papilionidae
- Genus: Papilio
- Species: P. demoleus

Binomial name
- Papilio demoleus Linnaeus, 1758

= Papilio demoleus =

Species of butterfly

Papilio demoleus is a common and widespread swallowtail butterfly. The butterfly is also known as the lemon butterfly and chequered swallowtail. These common names refer to their host plants, which are usually citrus species such as the cultivated lime. Unlike most swallowtail butterflies, it does not have a prominent tail. When the adult stage is taken into consideration, the lime swallowtail is the shortest-lived butterfly, with male adults dying after four days and females after a week. The butterfly is native to Asia and Australia, and can be considered an invasive pest in other parts of the world. The butterfly has spread to Hispaniola (in the Dominican Republic and Haiti) and the rest of the Antilles in the Western Hemisphere, and to Mahé, Seychelles.

== Description ==
The butterfly is tailless and has a wingspan 80–100 mm. Above, the background colour is black. A broad, irregular yellow band is found on the wings above, which is broken in the case of the forewing. Besides this, the butterfly has a large number of irregular spots on the wing. The upper hindwing has a red tornal spot with blue edging around it.

As the caterpillar ages, its hunger for leaf tissue continues to grow.

Detailed description as given by Charles Thomas Bingham in 1905:

"Upper side of wings has the ground colour black. The fore wing has the base below cell and basal half of latter so irrorated with yellow scales as to form more or less complete transverse dotted lines, two outwardly oblique yellow spots in cell and a curved spot at its upper apex; a spot at base and another beyond it in interspace 8; a discal transverse series of cream-yellow spots irregular in arrangement and size extends from interspace la to 8; the series interrupted in interspace 5 and the spot in interspace 7 double; this is followed by a sinuous postdiscal series of spots and an admarginal terminal series of smaller spots. In many specimens between the discal and postdiscal series the black ground-colour is irrorated with yellowish scales. Hind wing: base and an edging that decreases in width along the dorsal margin irrorated with yellow scales; followed by a broad medial yellow irregular band, a sinuous postdiscal series of outwardly emarginate yellow spots and a terminal series of smaller similarly coloured spots as on the fore wing. The inner margin of the medial band is curved inwards, the outer margin is very irregular and uneven; in the cell the band does not reach the apex, but beyond the cell there are one or more cream-yellow spots, and the black groundcolour is irrorated with yellowish scales; finally at the tornal angle there is an oval ochraceous-red spot emarginate on its inner side in the female and in both sexes surmounted by a blue lunule; while in interspace 7 between the medial band and the postdiscal spot there is a large ocellus-like spot of the black ground-colour more or less irrorated with blue scales."

"The underside has the ground-colour similar, the cream-coloured markings paler and conspicuously larger. The markings differ from those on the upperside in that the forewing has the basal half of cell and base of wing below it with cream-coloured streaks that coalesce at base; irregular ochraceous spots in interspaces 5 to 8 and the discal series of spots complete not interrupted in interspace 5. On the underside of the hind wing, the black at base of wing and along the dorsal margin centred largely with pale cream-colour; the ocellus in interspace 7, the apex of the cell and the black groundcolour between the medial band and postdiscal markings in interspaces 2–6 centred with ochraceous, margined with blue.

Antennae dark reddish brown, touched with ochraceous on the innerside towards the club; head, thorax and abdomen dusky black, the head and thorax anteriorly streaked with cream-vellow: beneath: the palpi, thorax and abdomen cream-yellow with lateral longitudinal black lines on the last."

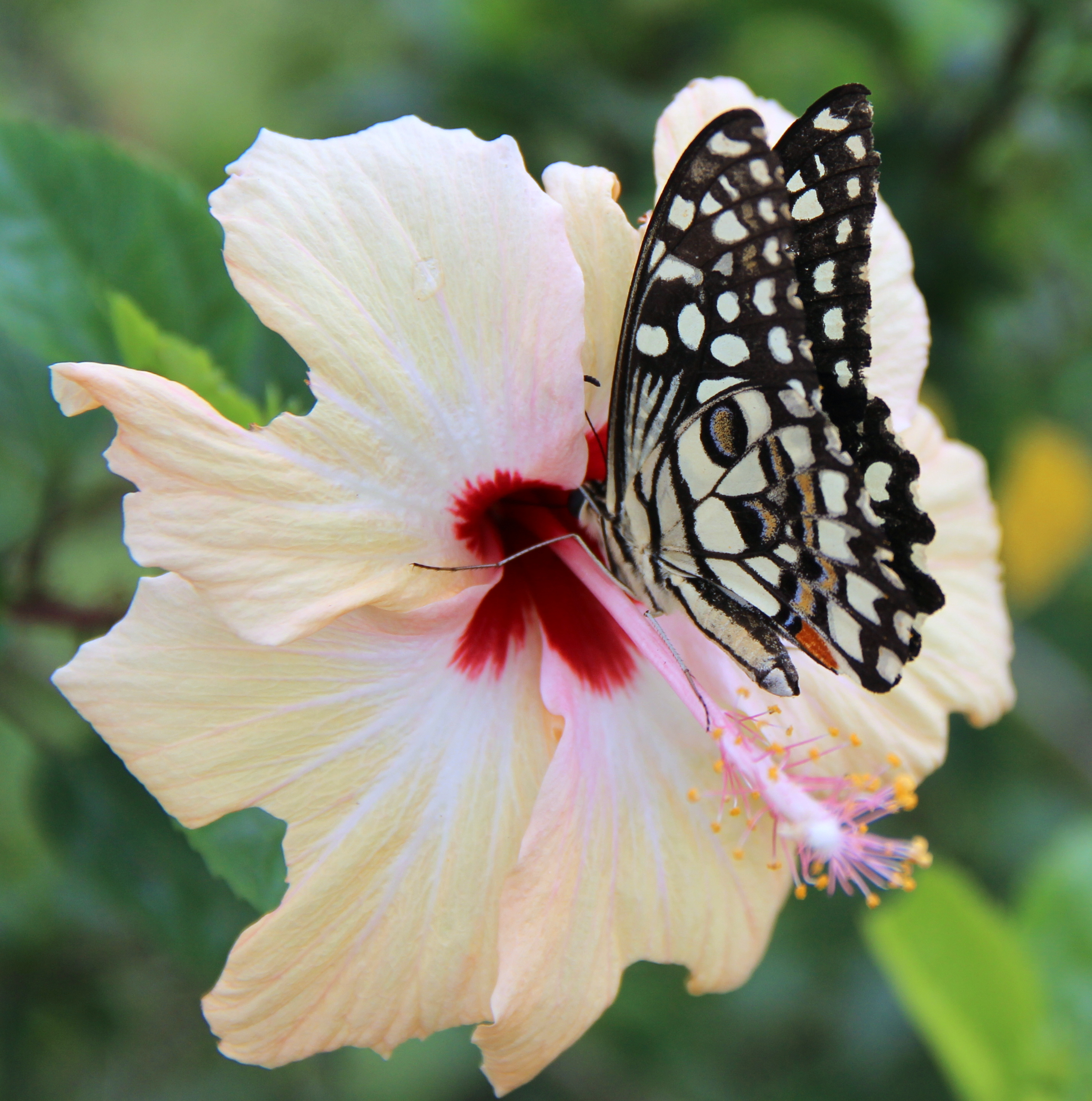
Collecting nectar from chinarose at ABS Academy Campus, Durgapur, West Bengal, India

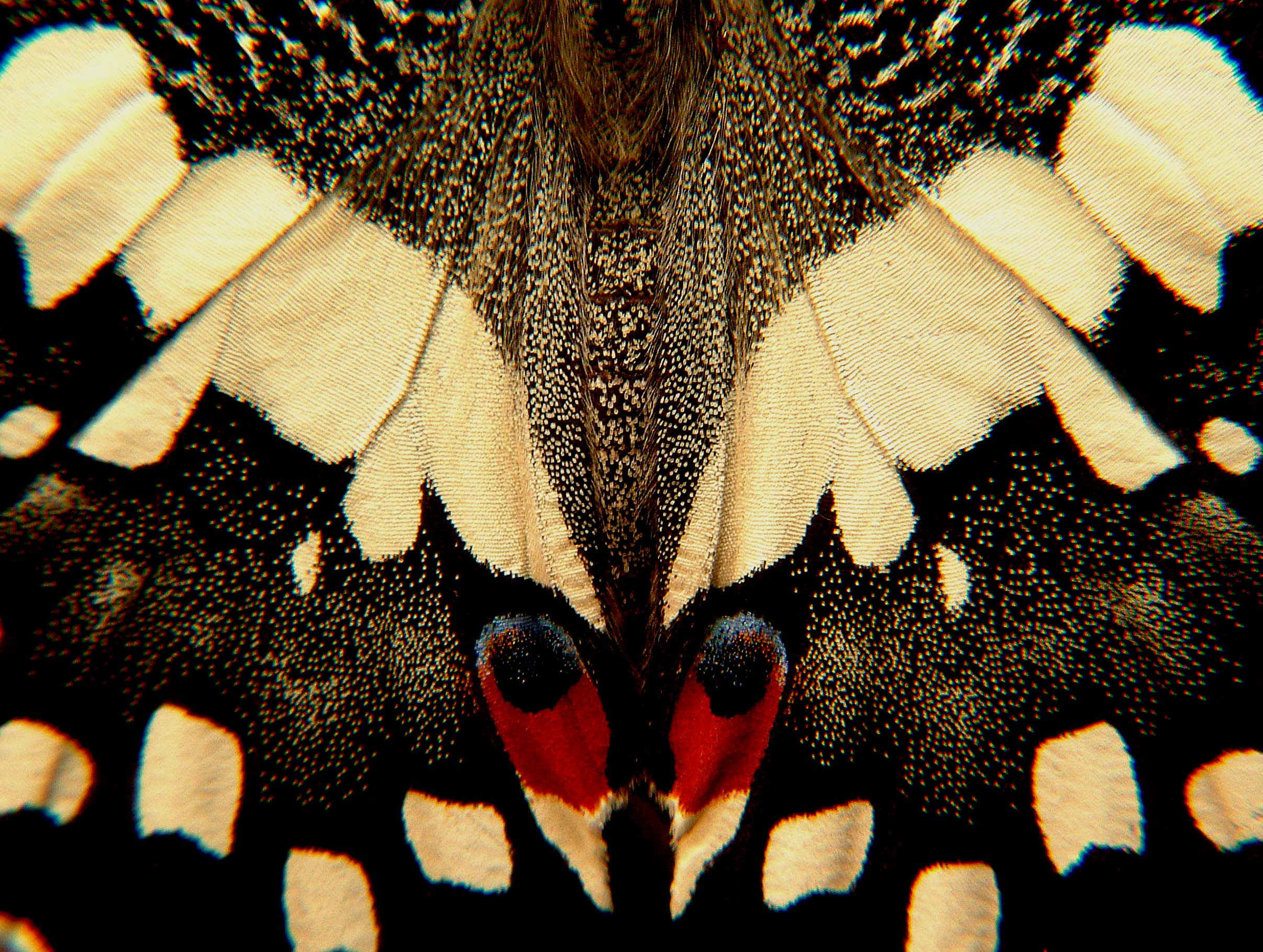
The red tornal spot with blue edging

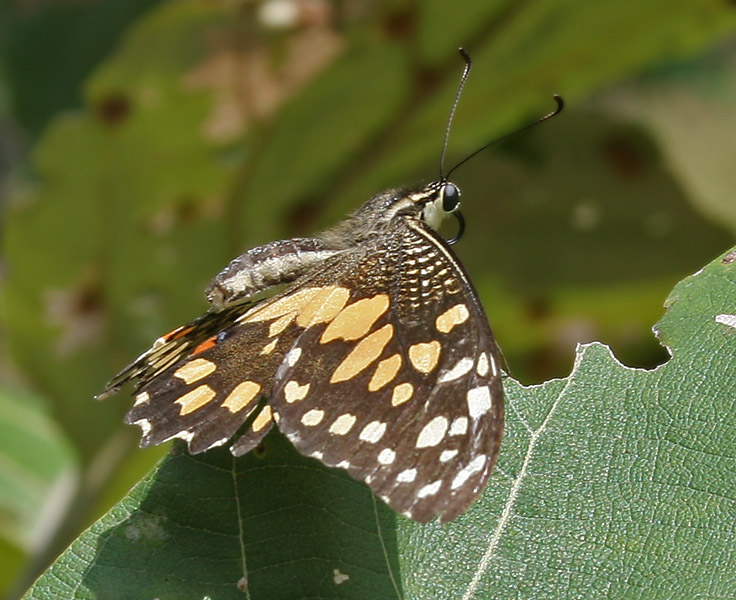
An older adult with orange spots

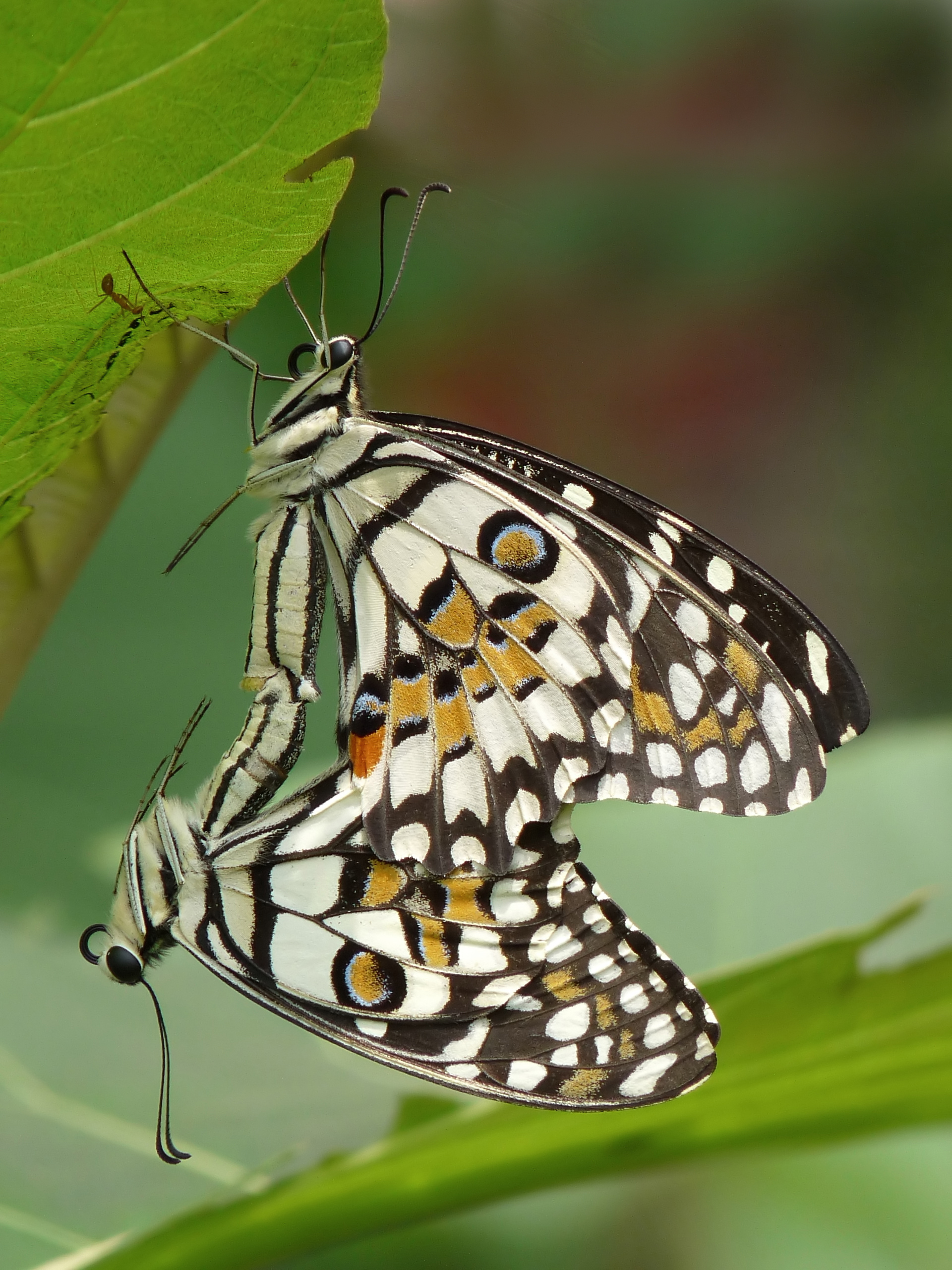
Mating

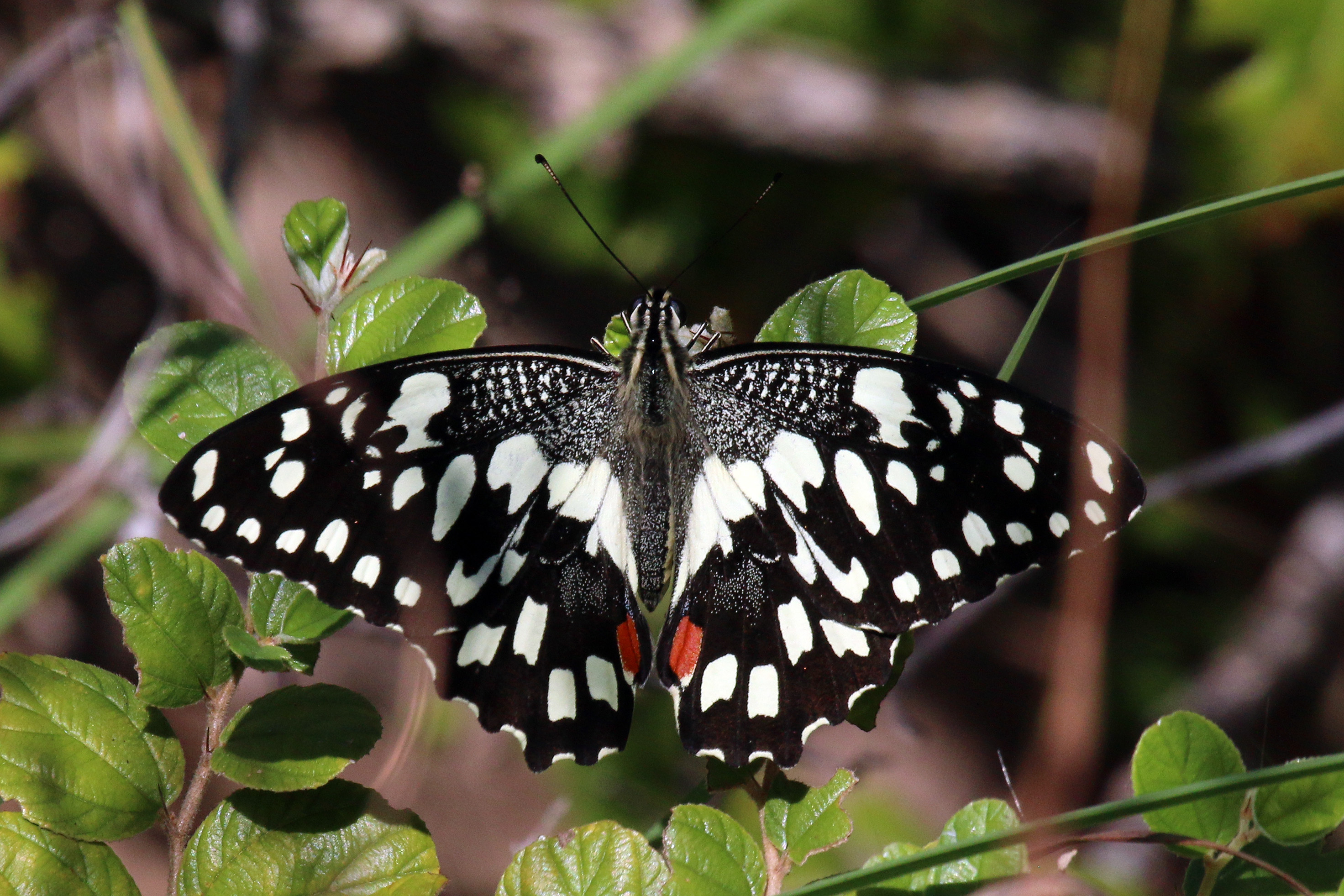
P. d. stenelinus
Rinca, Indonesia

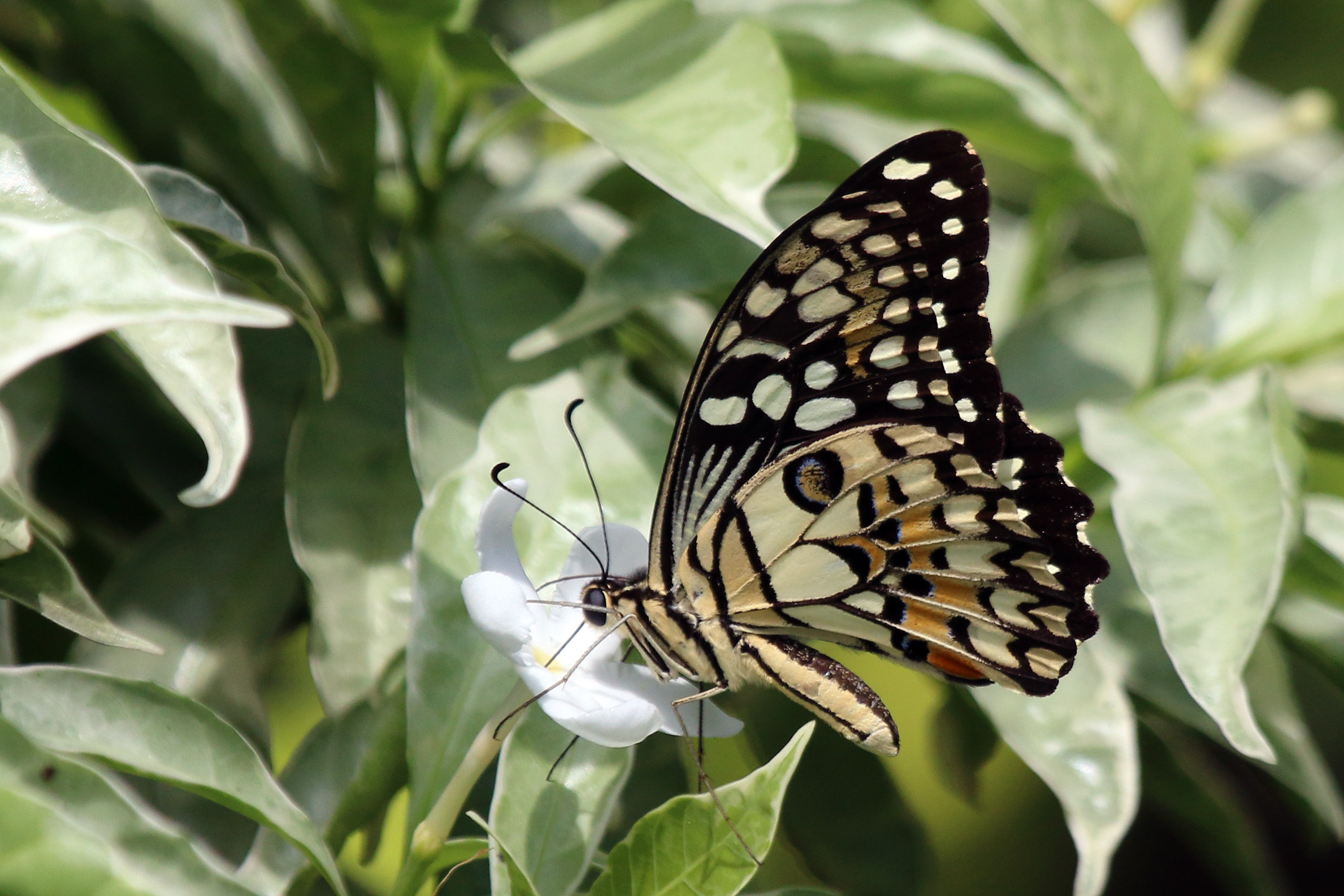
P. d. malayanus
Singapore

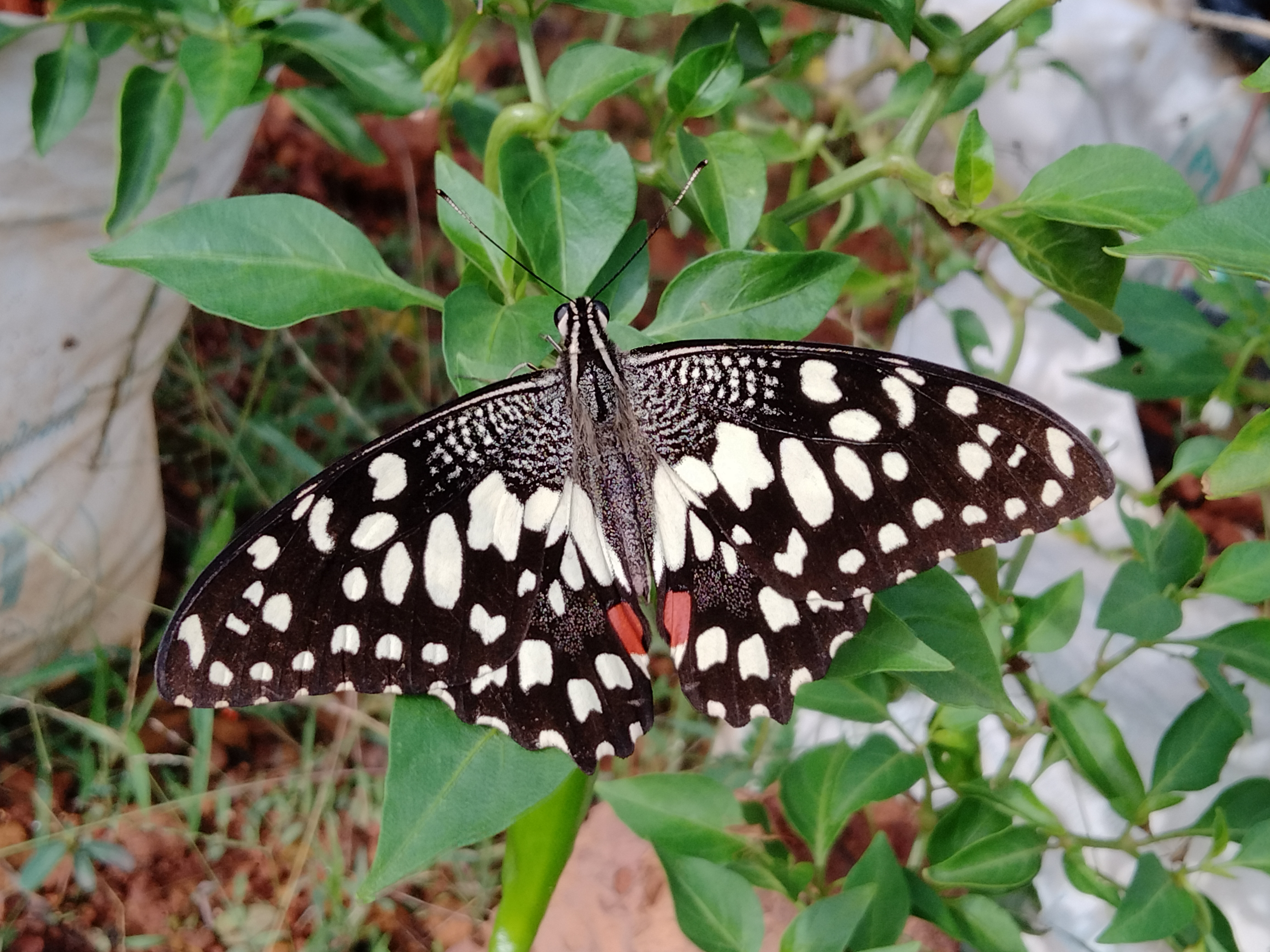
Papilio demoleus- at Kasaragod, Kerala, India

== Status, range, and habitat ==
P. demoleus is perhaps the most widely distributed swallowtail in the world. The butterfly can be found in:

Syria, Israel, Iraq, Oman, United Arab Emirates, Kuwait, Qatar, Iran, western and possibly eastern Afghanistan, the South Asian Subcontinent (India including the Andamans, Bangladesh, western Pakistan, Sri Lanka, Nepal), Myanmar, Thailand, the Philippines, Cambodia, Vietnam, southern China (including Hainan, Guangdong province), Taiwan, Japan (rare strays), Malaysia, Singapore, Indonesia (Kalimantan, Sumatra, Sula, Talaud, Flores, Alor and Sumba), Papua New Guinea, Australia (including Lord Howe Island), Solomon Islands, Hawaii, and possibly other Pacific Ocean islands.

The Southeast Asian subspecies Papilio demoleus malayanus recently established an abundant non-native population on Mahé in Seychelles This species was probably accidentally introduced to Mahé a few years ago (first records in November 2016). Further dispersal events of Papilio demoleus within Seychelles to other granitic islands of the archipelago, e.g. Praslin and La Digue, are expected.

Formerly absent from Borneo, it is now one of the commonest papilionids in Sabah and Sarawak in Malaysian Borneo, Kalimantan (Indonesian Borneo), and Brunei.

In recent years, the butterfly has spread to island of Hispaniola (in the Dominican Republic and Haiti) in the Western Hemisphere, and subsequently to Jamaica, Cuba, the northern Lesser Antilles and Puerto Rico. The Dominican population originated from Southeast Asia but how the butterfly reached there is not known. A pupa of the species was reported on Key West, Florida by a user on INaturalist in September 2022.

The widespread range of P. demoleus indicates the butterfly's tolerance and adaptation to diverse habitats. It is found in savannahs, fallow lands, gardens, evergreen and semi-evergreen forests, and shows a preference for streams and riverbeds. In India, it is mostly found in the plains, but can be found on the hills of peninsular India and up to 7,000 feet (2,100 m) in the Himalayas. It is common in urban gardens and may also be encountered in wooded country. The butterfly is also a very successful invader, its spread appearing to be due to its strong flight, increase in urbanisation and agricultural land use that opens up new areas for dispersal, and greater availability of food plants.

== Taxonomy ==
Five related butterflies form the group of lime butterflies in the genus Papilio of which P. demoleus Linnaeus, 1758 is the flagship species, which gives the name to the group. The other morphologically related butterflies are:

- Papilio demodocus (Esper, 1798)
- Papilio erithonioides Grose-Smith, 1891
- Papilio grosesmithi Rothschild, 1926
- Papilio morondavana Grose-Smith, 1891

The citrus swallowtail (P. demodocus Esper) is found in sub-Saharan Africa, while the other three species are endemic to Madagascar.

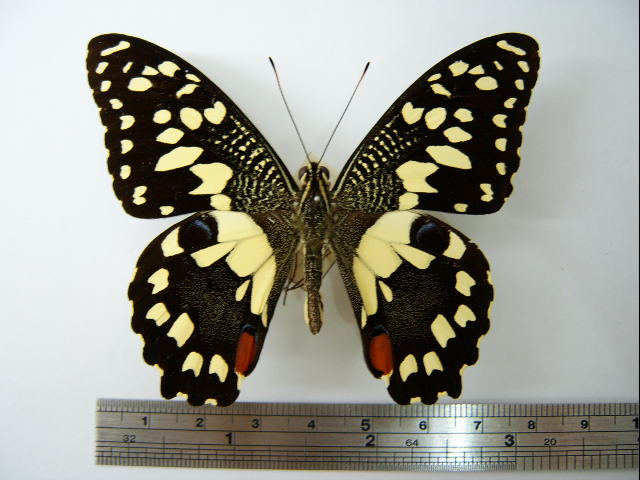
Common lime butterfly,
P. demoleus

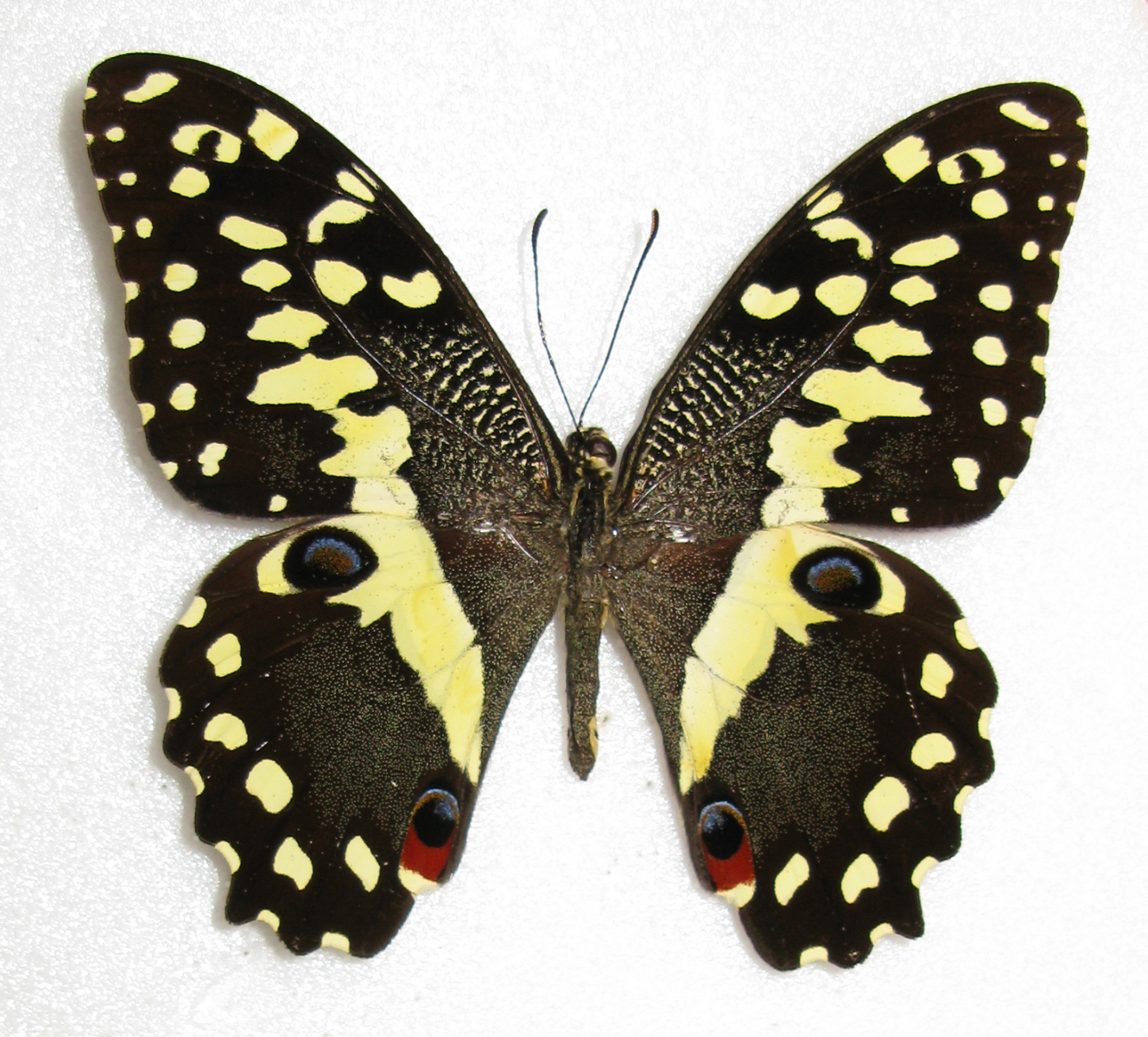
Citrus swallowtail,
P. demodocus

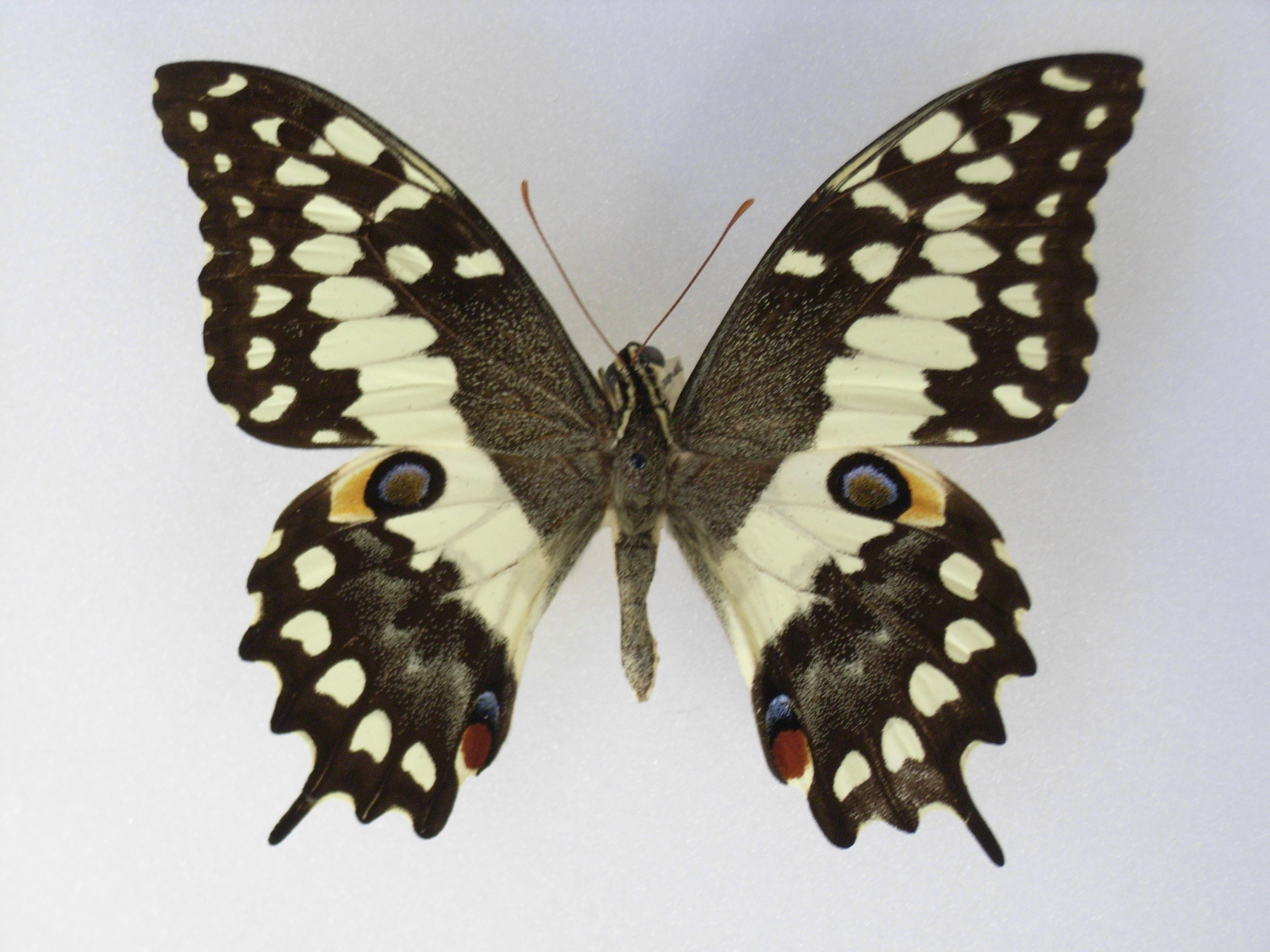
Madagascan emperor swallowtail,
Papilio morondavana

Research into the biogeography, phylogeny, and analysis of vicariance relationships dating back to the Cretaceous, of the "lime butterfly" or "demoleus" group, suggest that the group of lime swallowtails diversified in Madagascar in the middle Miocene.

Six subspecies are recognised in P. demoleus:

- P. d. demoleus Linnaeus, 1758 — Across Asia from China to the Arabian peninsula, and now colonized Turkey, Iraq, Syria, the Philippines, the Talaud and Sula islands, and the Moluccas (Ambon and Ceram)
- P. d. libanius Fruhstorfer, 1908 — Taiwan, Philippines, Sula, Talaud
- P. d. malayanus Wallace, 1865 — Sumatra and the Malaysian peninsula, and now expanded its range to Southern Europe (one record in Portugal), Greater Sunda Islands (Sumatra, Java, Borneo, and Bali), Wallacea (Sulawesi, Sumbawa, Lombok, Timor, Leti, Flores, Wetar, and Alor), New Guinea, Bismarck Archipelago, Christmas Island, Torres Strait Islands (Dauan Island), Greater Antilles Islands (Hispaniola, Jamaica, Puerto Rico, Cuba, and Nueva Gerona), and Seychelles (Mahé)
- P. d. novoguineensis Rothschild, 1908 — the southeastern edge of Papua New Guinea around Port Moresby
- P. d. sthenelus Macleay, 1826 — Australia
- P. d. stenelinus Rothschild, 1895 — Sumba, Flores, and Alor

== Behavior ==
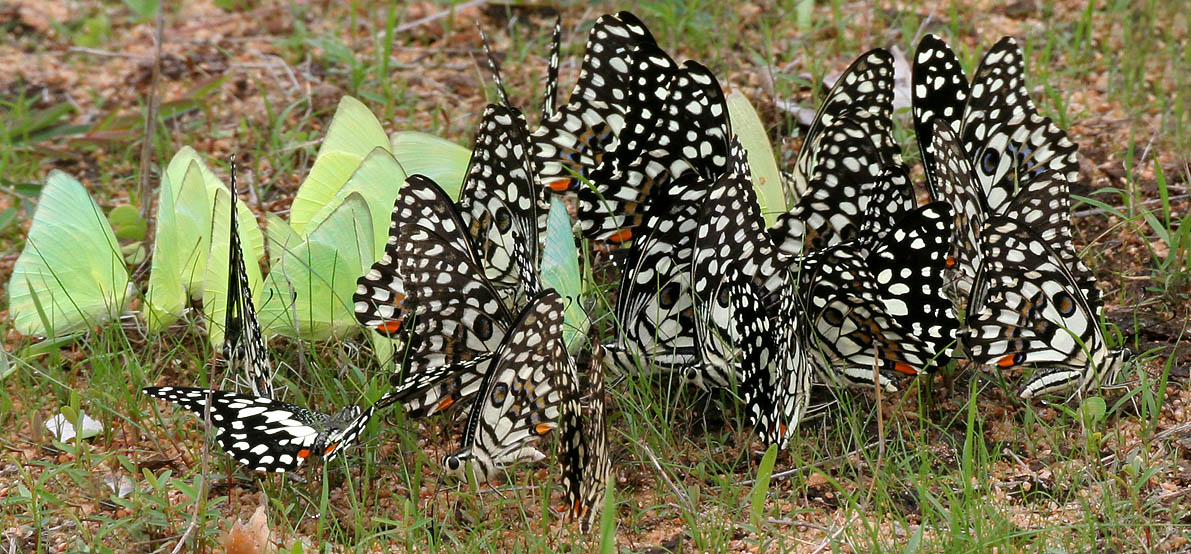
Lime butterflies mud-puddling with common emigrants (Catopsilia pomona) in India

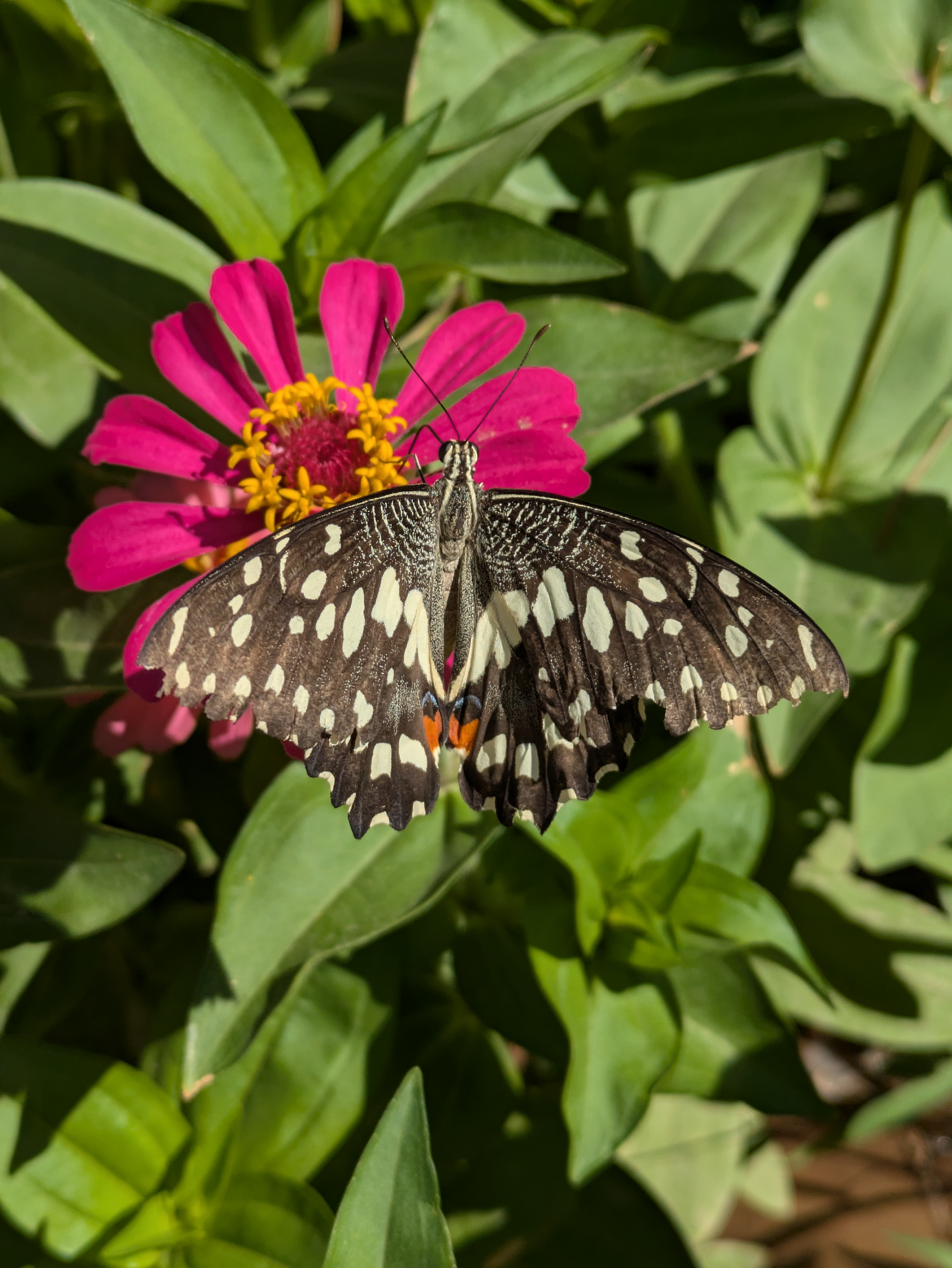
Lime Butterfly in Behbahan

This butterfly is an avid mud-puddler and visitor of flowers. It basks with its wings held wide open on tufts of grass and herbs, and generally keeps within a metre of the ground, even on cloudy days. It relies on its quick flight for escape. It has a number of modes of flight. In the cool of the morning, the flight is slow considering that it is an edible and unprotected swallowtail. As the day progresses, it flies fast, straight, and low. In the hotter part of the day, it may be found settling on damp patches, where it will remain motionless, except for an occasional flutter of wings, if not disturbed. It is also a frequent visitor of flowers in gardens, where it shows a preference for flowers of smaller herbs rather than larger plants such as the ubiquitous Lantana with its plentiful blooms. It can be found swarming in the groves of its food plants.

Research on freshly emerged imagines of P. demoleus showed that they have an inborn or spontaneous preference while feeding for blue and purple colours, while the yellow, yellowish-green, green, and blue-green colours are completely neglected. Adults also demonstrated a preference for red and orange flowers entirely avoiding flowers of green and black coloration. Male lime butterflies correctly identified and courted females without odor using colour cues alone.

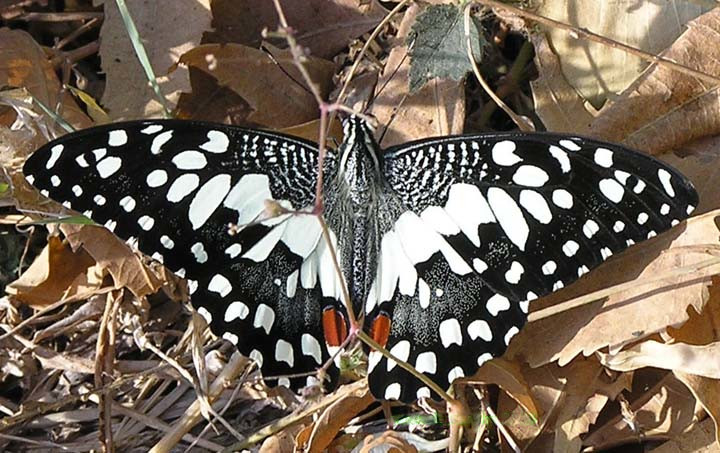
P. demoleus basking

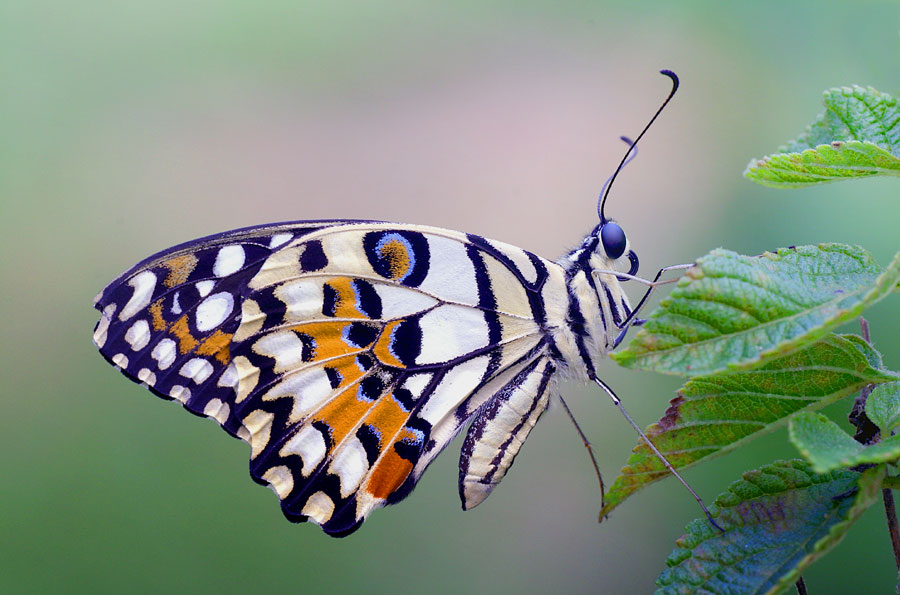
While resting, the butterfly closes its wing over its back and draws the forewings between the hindwings.

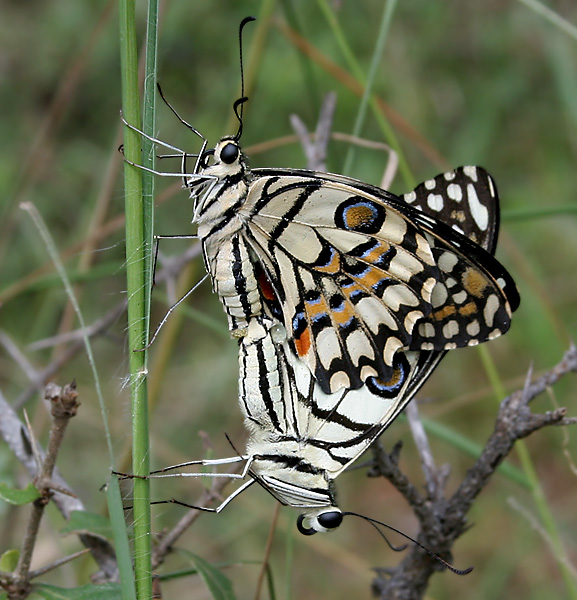
Lime butterflies mating in Narsapur, Medak district, India

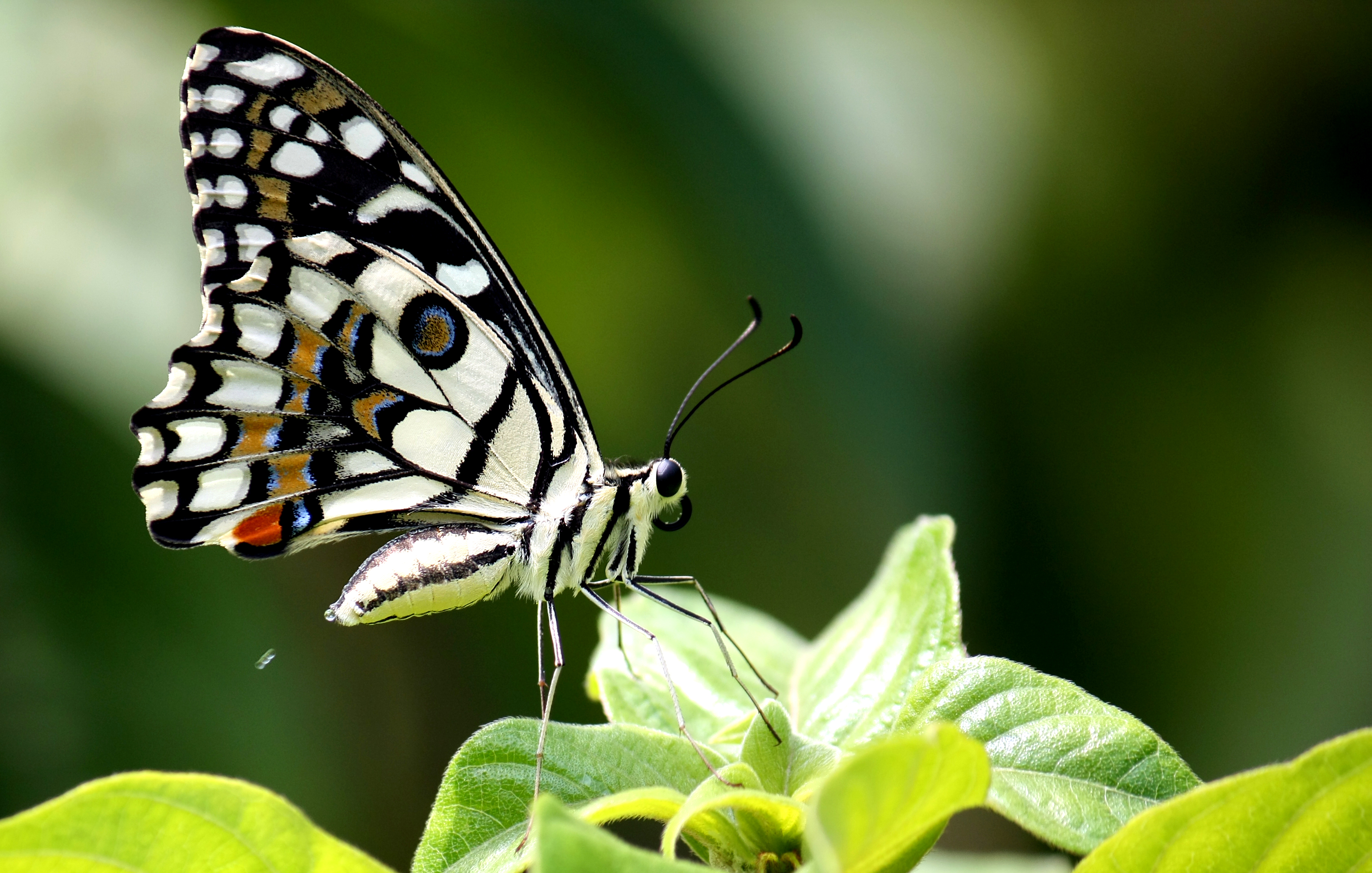
Lime butterfly on a leaf during excreting

== Lifecycle ==
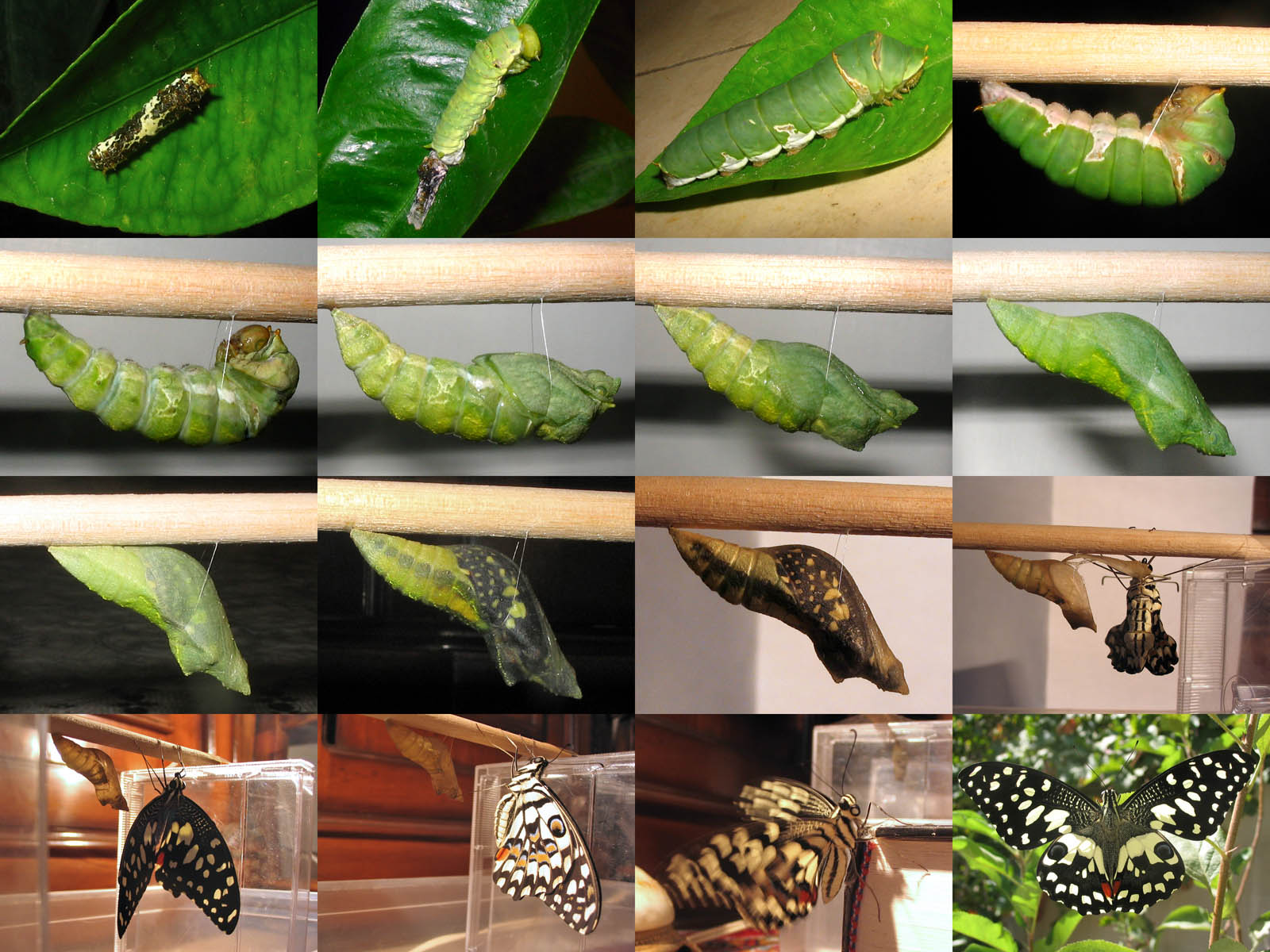
Lifecycle of common lime butterfly (P. demoleus)

The number of generations of P. demoleus is dependent upon temperature – near the equator, nine generations have been recorded, while in warm temperate China, five generations have been recorded. In the ideal conditions of a laboratory, a generation has been recorded to take place in just over 30 days. The typical time for one generation of P. demoleus to mature in the field ranges from 26 to 59 days. In cold climates, the lime butterfly is known to pass the winter as pupae. Typically, the butterfly undergoes five instars as a caterpillar.

The female butterfly goes from plant to plant, laying a single egg at a time on top of a leaf, which it holds onto with its legs, and flies off as soon as the egg is laid. The egg is round, light yellowish in colour, flattened at the base, smooth-surfaced, and about 1.5 mm in height. Fertile eggs develop a small red mark at the apex.

The newly hatched caterpillar stays in the middle of the upperside of the leaf. The first instar of the caterpillar is black, with a black head and two rows of subdorsal fleshy spines. The second, third, and fourth instars are dark, with a glossy, dark-brown head, and white markings on the eighth and ninth segments of the caterpillar, which resemble a white patch of uric acid deposited in a bird's droppings, helping them escape predation while remaining in moderately open places.

As the instars progress, this resemblance is lost. From the fifth instar onwards, the caterpillars now turn cylindrical in shape, tapered towards the rear, and uniformly pale green in colour with a white subspiracular band. An additional black band is developed on the fourth and fifth segments with two black and two bluish spots on them. The eighth and ninth segments, which earlier provided the camouflage markings now develop a brown and white band. At this stage, the caterpillars are forced to inhabit secluded places.

The pupa, which is rugose (wrinkled), stout, and 30 mm in length, has two projections to the front on its head and also one on its thorax, and resembles that of the common Mormon (Papilio polytes), the difference being that the common Mormon pupa has a deeper cut between the projections and its abdomen is more protruded on the sides, having a small point.

The pupa is dimorphic with regards to colour, with the colour developing according to the prevalent colour and texture in the background. The green morph, which is found amongst green vegetation and smoother textures, is light green and unmarked or with yellow dorsal markings. When situated among brown or dry objects, the pupa tend to turn light grey brown to pink brown and develop cryptic dark brown and black striation.

The adults fly in every month, but are particularly abundant during and after the monsoons.

Captive breeding of P. demoleus in Riyadh has revealed these data about the lifespan of various stages at that locality:

- Number of generations per year: 8
- Duration of egg stage: 3.1 to 6.1 days
- Duration of larva stage: 12.9 and 22.7 days
- Duration of pupa stage: 8.0 to 22.4 days
- Duration of adult stage: 4 to 6 days with average of 5.1 days
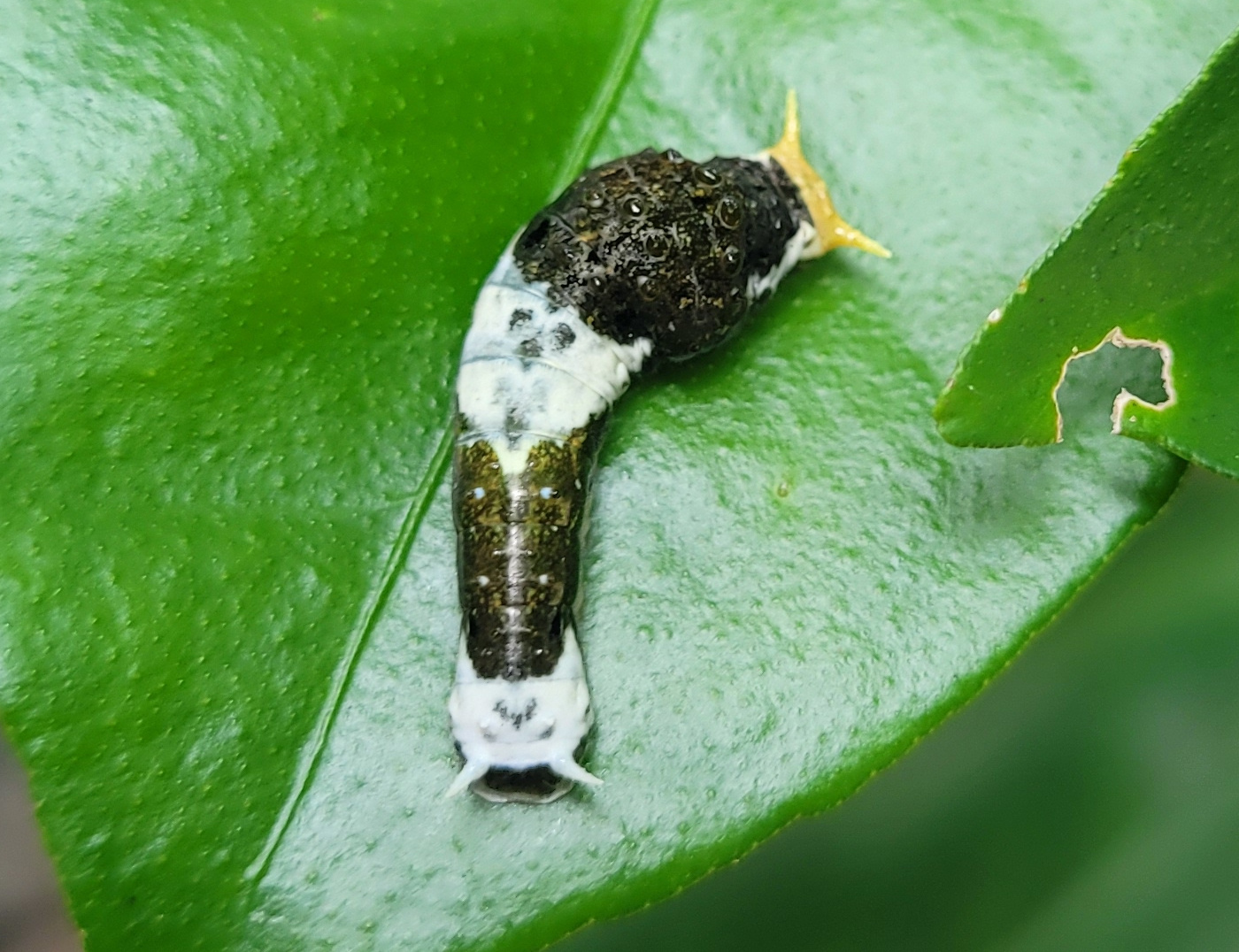
Early-instar "bird-dropping" caterpillar

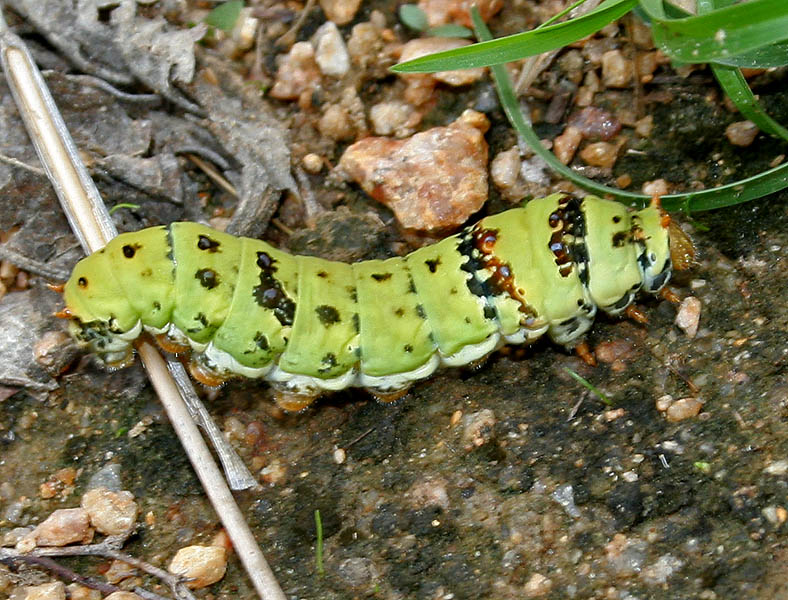
early fifth-instar caterpillar

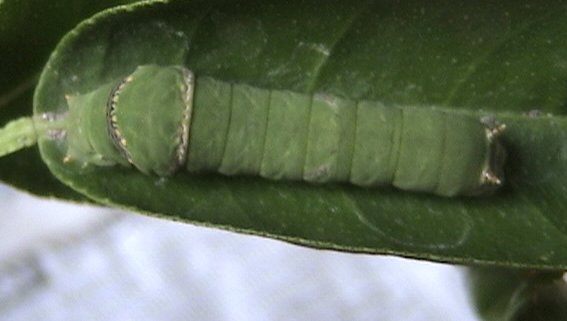
late fifth-instar caterpillar

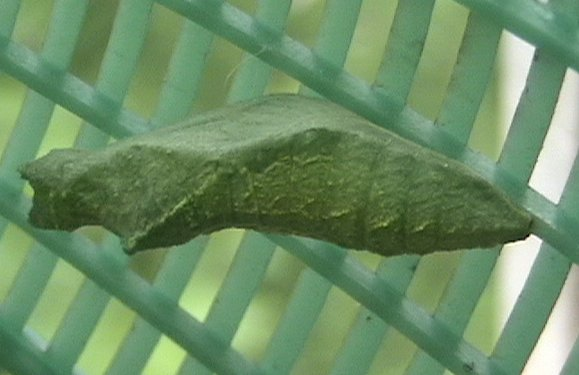
Pupa in rearing cage

=== Parasitism and predation ===
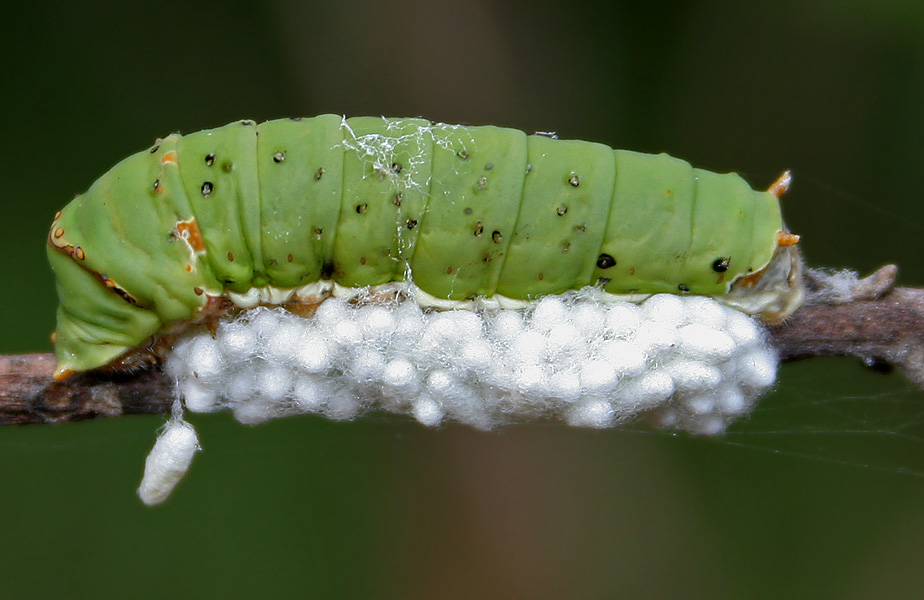
Cocoons of a parasitoid wasp (Apanteles species), next to a perforated P. demoleus caterpillar

Despite their two-stage camouflage scheme, some caterpillars of P. demoleus are found by parasitic wasps, which lay dozens of eggs in them. The parasitic wasp larvae eat the caterpillar from the inside. Initially, the vital organs are avoided, but by the time the caterpillar is ready to pupate, even the vital organs are consumed. Shortly before, or soon after the caterpillar pupates, the parasitoids emerge from their host, thus killing it.

In Saudi Arabia, the highest mortality rate was found to be in larvae and pupae in cultivated populations due to a bacterium of the genus Bacillus. In addition, eggs and larvae were heavily preyed upon by two unidentified species of spiders which were abundant on citrus trees.

In China, species of fungi in the genus Ophiocordyceps are known to parasitize many kinds of caterpillars, including P. demoleus. The spores were spread out on the parents, and infect the young caterpillar, then when the caterpillars become pupae, they will fail to develop into adults; instead, the fungi kill and eat the caterpillar flesh from within, and grow a spore bud out of the dead caterpillar corpse. The fungi known as dōng chóng xià cǎo are thought to have medicinal properties in China, and are known in English as caterpillar fungus.

In India, these braconid wasp parasitoids are known to parasitize P. demoleus larvae:

- Apanteles species including Apanteles papilionis
- Habrobracon hebetor

In Thailand, a number of organisms have been recorded attacking immature stages of P. demoleus:

- Egg parasites –
  - Ooencyrtus malayensis Ferriere (Hymenoptera: Encyrtidae)
  - Tetrastichus sp. (Hymenoptera: Eulophidae)
- Larval stage –
  - Erycia nymphalidophaga Baronoff (Diptera: Tachinidae) (parasite)
  - Cantheconidea furcellata (Wolff) (Pentatomidae predator
  - Other natural enemies of larvae included reduviid bugs; birds; spiders; sphecid wasps; and chameleons.
- Pupal parasites –
  - Brachymeria sp. (Hymenoptera: Chalcididae)
  - Pteromalus puparum Linnaeus (Hymenoptera: Pteromalidae)
  - Ophiocordyceps

In Jamaica, an encyrtid egg parasitoid and a chalcidoid parasitoid have been reported.

== Food plants ==
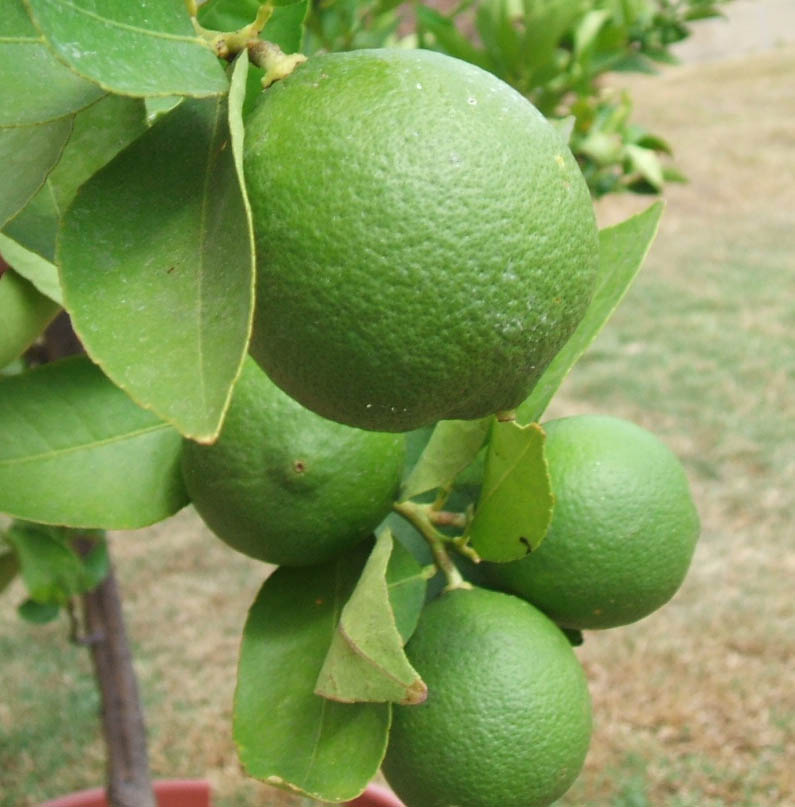
Key lime, a species of the cultivated lime, the principal food plant of P. demoleus

The larval food plants of P. demoleus in Asia are from the family Rutaceae, while in Australia and Papua New Guinea, the butterfly also feeds on host plants of family Fabaceae.

=== Family Rutaceae ===
- Cultivated lime, orange and lemon.
  - C. aurantifolia, C. grandis, C. limon, C. sinensis,
- Atalanta racemosa
- Glycosmis pentaphylla
- Ruta graveolens
- Bael (Aegle marmelos)
- Murraya koenigii (curry tree)
- Chloroxylon swietenia
- Acronychia pedunculata
- Microcitrus australis (Australian round-lime, Australian lime)

=== Family Rhamnaceae ===
- Ber (Ziziphus mauritiana)

=== Family Fabaceae ===
They have been observed on:

- Many species of Cullen: Cullen australasicum, C. badocanum, C. balsamicum, C. cinereum, C. patens (spreading scurf-pea, native verbine), C. pustulatum, and C. tenax (tough scurf-pea, emu-foot, emu grass), and C. leucanthum.
- Psoralea pinnata (fountain bush)

== Economic significance ==
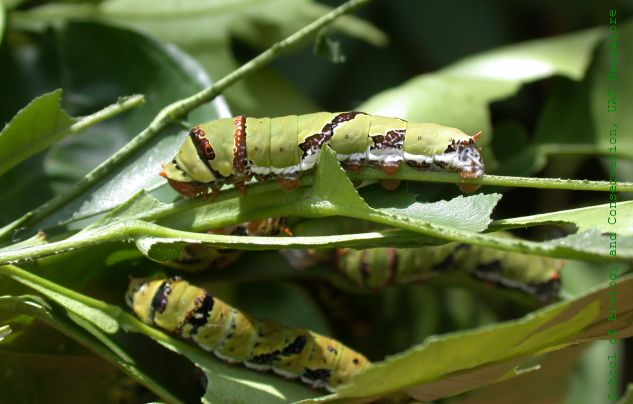
Caterpillars devouring lemon leaves

The lime butterfly is an economic pest on many cultivated citrus species in India, Pakistan, Iraq, and the Middle East. Due to its history of successful dispersal and range extension, the lime butterfly is likely to spread from its original point of introduction in Hispaniola in the Caribbean to neighbouring Florida, Central America, and South America. Due to its capability for rapid population growth under favourable circumstances and its having been recorded to have five generations in a year in temperate regions of China, it is considered a serious potential threat. The caterpillars can completely defoliate young citrus trees (below 2 feet) and devastate citrus nurseries. In mature trees, caterpillars may prefer young leaves and leaf flush.

Hand-picking of caterpillars and spraying with endosulfan 35 EC (2 ml/10 litres of water) were the recommended means of pest control by Indian government agencies and agricultural colleges, however, endosulfan has since been banned by the Supreme Court of India.

== See also ==
- List of butterflies of India (Papilionidae)
- List of butterflies of Jamaica
