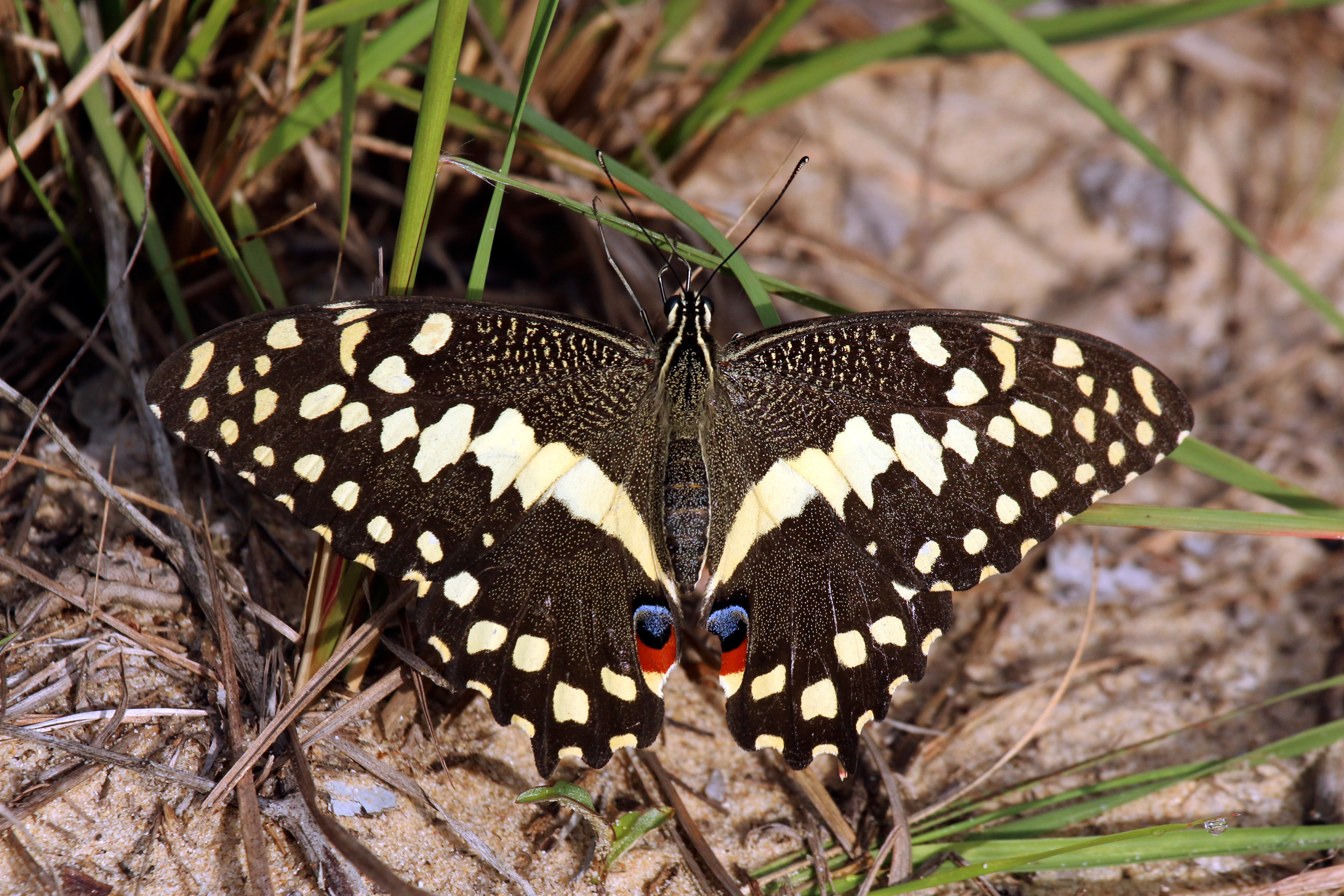

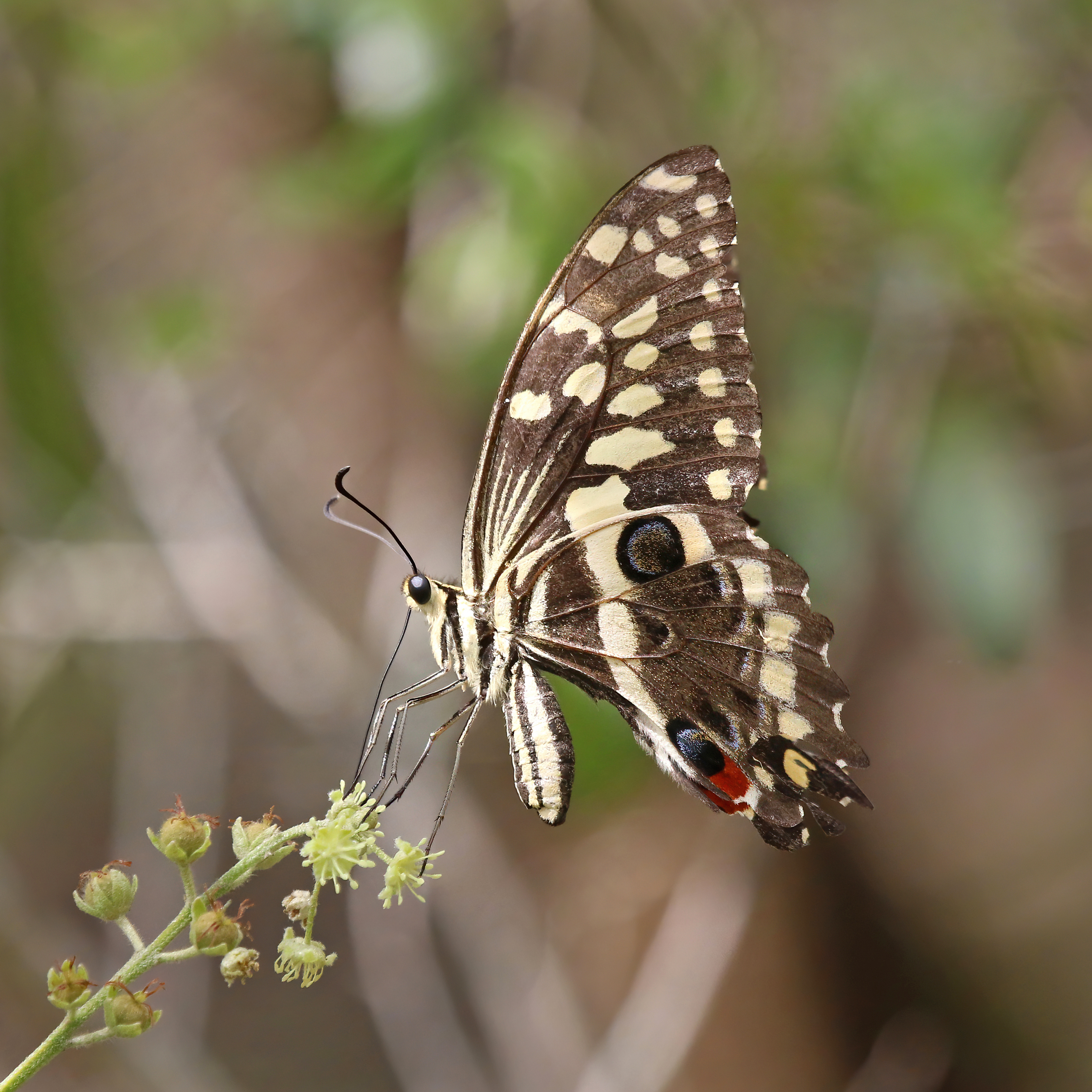
- Both in KwaZulu Natal, South Africa

Conservation status
- Least Concern (IUCN 3.1)

Scientific classification
- Kingdom: Animalia
- Phylum: Arthropoda
- Clade: Pancrustacea
- Class: Insecta
- Order: Lepidoptera
- Family: Papilionidae
- Genus: Papilio
- Species: P. demodocus

Binomial name
- Papilio demodocus Esper, 1798

Synonyms
- Papilio demodocus var. nubila Capronnier, 1881; Papilio demodocus decusdemo Suffert, 1904; Papilio demodocus albicans Suffert, 1904; Papilio demodocus ab. karema Strand, 1911; Papilio demodocus ab. cariei Le Cerf, 1913; Papilio demodocus ab. tessmanni Schultze, 1914; Papilio demodocus ab. conflua Strand, 1914; Papilio demodocus f. epunctatus Le Cerf, 1927; Papilio demodocus demodocus ab. minor Dufrane, 1936; Papilio demodocus demodocus ab. juncta Dufrane, 1936; Papilio demodocus demodocus ab. semijuncta Dufrane, 1936; Papilio demodocus demodocus ab. mathieui Dufrane, 1936; Papilio demodocus demodocus ab. houzeaui Dufrane, 1936; Papilio demodocus f. longsdoni Krüger, 1937; Papilio demodocus f. oblongula Berio, 1941; Papilio demodocus f. viginta Berio, 1941; Papilio demodocus f. adla Berio, 1941; Papilio demodocus demodocus ab. vreuricki Dufrane, 1946; Papilio demodocus demodocus ab. duboisi Dufrane, 1946; Papilio demodocus demodocus ab. aurantiaca Dufrane, 1946; Papilio demodocus demodocus ab. ochrea Dufrane, 1946; Papilio demodocus ab. dufranei Berger, 1950; Papilio demodocus ab. overlaeti Berger, 1950; Papilio demodocus f. confluens Storace, 1963; Papilio demodocus f. bennettoides Storace, 1963; Papilio demodocus f. atromaculatus Storace, 1963; Papilio demodocus f. continua Storace, 1963; Papilio demodocus f. deminuta Storace, 1963; Papilio demodocus f. flavocincta Storace, 1963; Papilio demodocus f. latevittata Storace, 1963; Papilio demodocus f. pseudopraeses Storace, 1963; Papilio demodocus ab. belonota Vári, 1976; Papilio bennetti Dixey, 1898

= Papilio demodocus =

Citrus swallowtail

Species of butterfly

Papilio demodocus, the citrus swallowtail or Christmas butterfly, is a swallowtail butterfly which commonly occurs over the entirety of sub-Saharan Africa, including Madagascar, besides the southern Arabian Peninsula. The caterpillars feed on various native plants of especially the family Rutaceae, but have also taken to the leaves of cultivated citrus trees.

Torben Larsen developed a species numbering system for his 2005 publication Butterflies of West Africa. The nominate subspecies is #13. The 'Larsen' numbers have since been used with permission in A Sharp Eye on Butterflies of Ghana.

== Life cycle ==
Citrus swallowtails pass through approximately three generations per year.

=== Eggs ===
Female butterflies lay their eggs singly on citrus leaves. After about six days, the egg hatches into an immature larva.

=== Immature larva ===
The immature larvae are black, yellow, and white with spikes. Their coloration provides effective camouflage, as they resemble bird droppings. They grow to a length of 10 or 15 mm before changing into mature larvae.

=== Mature larva ===
Mature larvae are green with white or pink markings and eyespots. They grow to a maximum length of about 45 mm.

Mature caterpillars lack the camouflage of their immature state. Instead, when threatened by a bird or other predator, they produce a forked, orange-coloured organ known as an osmeterium. The organ emits a strong smell which acts as a discouragement to the predator. The larvae are sometimes known as 'orange dogs'.

=== Pupa ===
The caterpillars attach themselves to branches with silk, transforming into pupae. They remain in the pupal form for two to three weeks before emerging as adults. It is dormant for four months in the pupa from May to August. Pupa will emerge in September

== Adult ==
Adult butterflies have black and yellow markings with red and blue eyespots. Female butterflies tend to be larger than males.

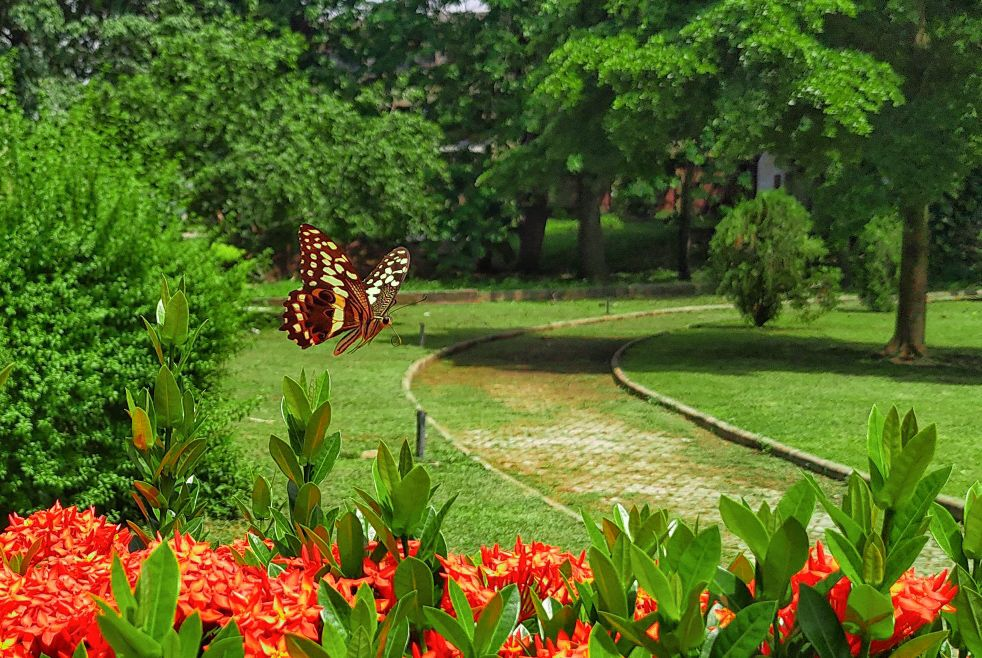
An adult visiting ixoras in the garden

== Natural enemies ==
As with most butterflies, various predators, parasitoids and diseases attack Papilio demodocus, so that integrated pest management is generally the most rational approach to control of infestations, paying due attention to avoiding destruction of the populations of enemies. In particular parasitic wasps in the family Encyrtidae, such as some species of the genus Ooencyrtus develop in Papilio eggs. Other parasitoidal wasps in families such as Chalcididae and Braconidae (for example genus Apanteles) attack the larvae, and Pteromalidae (for example genus Pteromalus) are parasitoids of the pupae. Predatory insects such as certain Heteroptera, in particular Reduviidae known as assassin bugs, and some Pentatomidae attack the larvae, and certain Mantodea such as genus Sphodromantis attack both larvae and adults.

== Taxonomy ==
Papilio demodocus is a member of the demoleus species group. The clade members are:

- Papilio demodocus Esper, 1799
- Papilio demoleus Linnaeus, 1758
- Papilio erithonioides Grose-Smith, 1891
- Papilio grosesmithi Rothschild, 1926
- Papilio morondavana Grose-Smith, 1891

== Subspecies ==
- Papilio demodocus demodocus — sub-Saharan Africa, including Madagascar
- Papilio demodocus bennetti Dixey, 1898 — Socotra

== Mating system ==
=== Courtship ===
Courtship is more or less the same in all Papilionidae. Once a female enters the visual field of a male, the male moves quickly to hover over her so that his wings beat rapidly. The female is then induced to land so that the male can attempt to mate with her. There are various ways in which the male entices the female, including visual, olfactory, tactile, and auditory cues. Of particular interest is the use of olfactory cues. Male butterflies produce pheromones from different structures, such as that of the anal fold of the hindwing, that cause the females to perform the appropriate response. Sometimes, however, a female can choose to reject a male's attempt at mating, often because she has already mated. She can do so by either avoiding his approach or, if she lands, she will flap her wings quickly and deliberately all while raising her abdomen until the male flies away. In this way, courtship is primarily a female's choice. Furthermore, it has been observed that females also produce a pheromone that aids males in determining whether a female has already mated or not.

=== Mating ===
This species primarily mates via the lek system, in which there are aggregations of males on small mating territories. When the female reaches the lek, she changes her behavior so that she helps the males to detect her by performing a long and obvious circular flight. The species operates on a polygynous system in which one male has the ability to mate with several females in one breeding season. In Papilio glaucus, that which is of the same genus of this species, the lack of male-male competition, strong rapid flight, dispersed abundant food, and oviposition sights helped to support the idea of mating system based on polygyny. The females are prevented from mating with other males when the male emits a sphragis, which prevents other males from mating with the female, ensuring that only the sperm from this male fertilizes the eggs. The physical act of copulation takes between one half hour to two hours. During this time, the male spermatophore is transferred to the female's bursa. The spermatophore is then absorbed and its nutrient (protein) contents are given to the female's eggs as a food source. For this reason, the male makes an indirect investment to his offspring, given that he offers them a food source, being beneficial to the female given that she risks less of her own well-being to bear her offspring. Therefore, a male is considered more fit with a larger ejaculation, given that he allows his offspring to feed so that his own genes may be passed on efficiently.

=== Mistakes and diversity ===
Mate assessment involves the discrimination of conspecifics, so that mating requires that males and females recognize and mate with individuals of the appropriate sex and species, as indicated by the appropriate chemical and visual cues that are made. Sometimes, homosexual copulation has been seen in addition to two males upon one female. Very rarely do females accept a mate from a different species or genus, and if they do, it is usually because they are too immature to realize the correct sexual cues of males from their own species. However, these "incorrect" matings do occur so that there is diversity in the species, as seen through the different larval patterns that have evolved in the species, depending on the type of plant the eggs are laid upon.

== Gallery ==
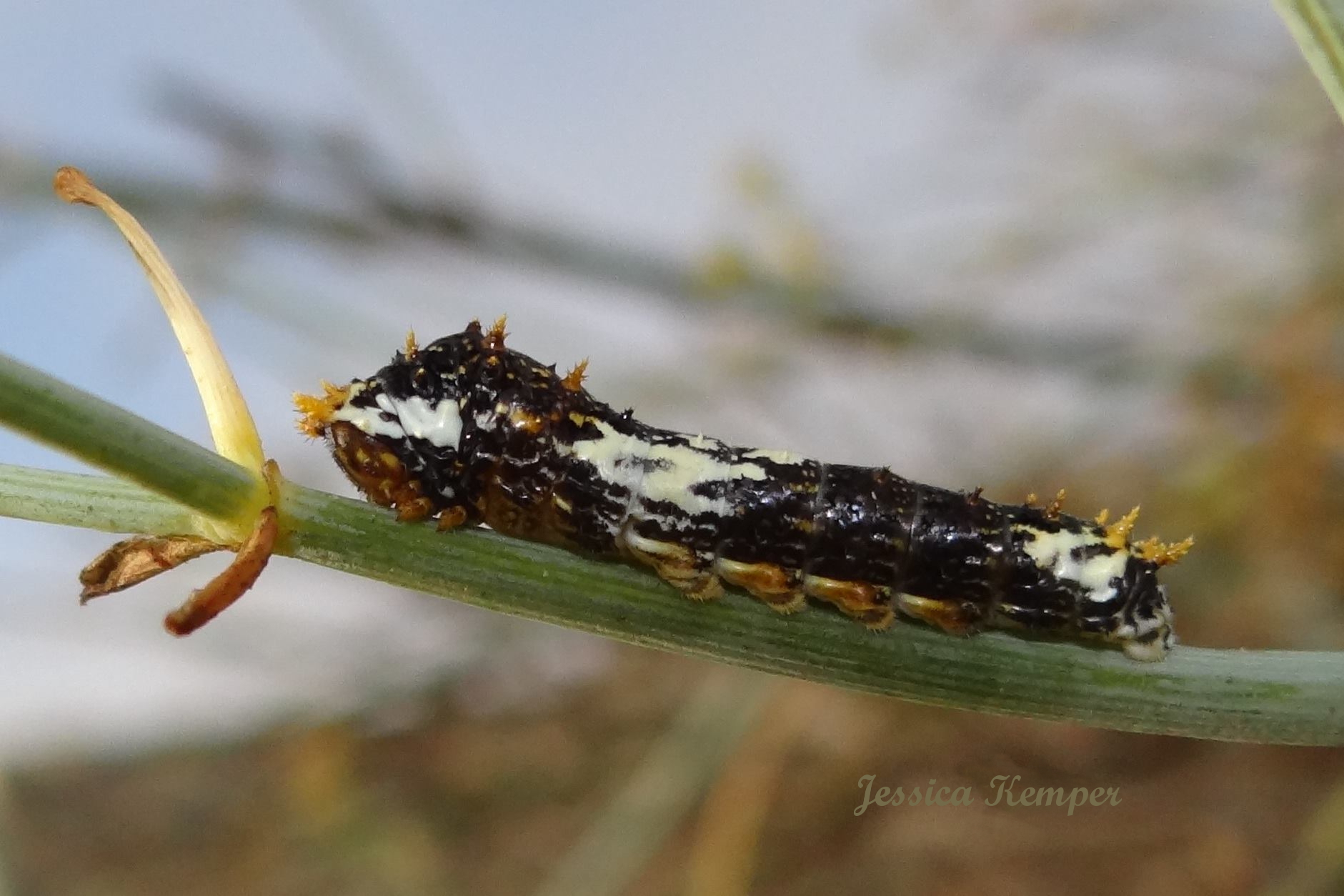
Early instar

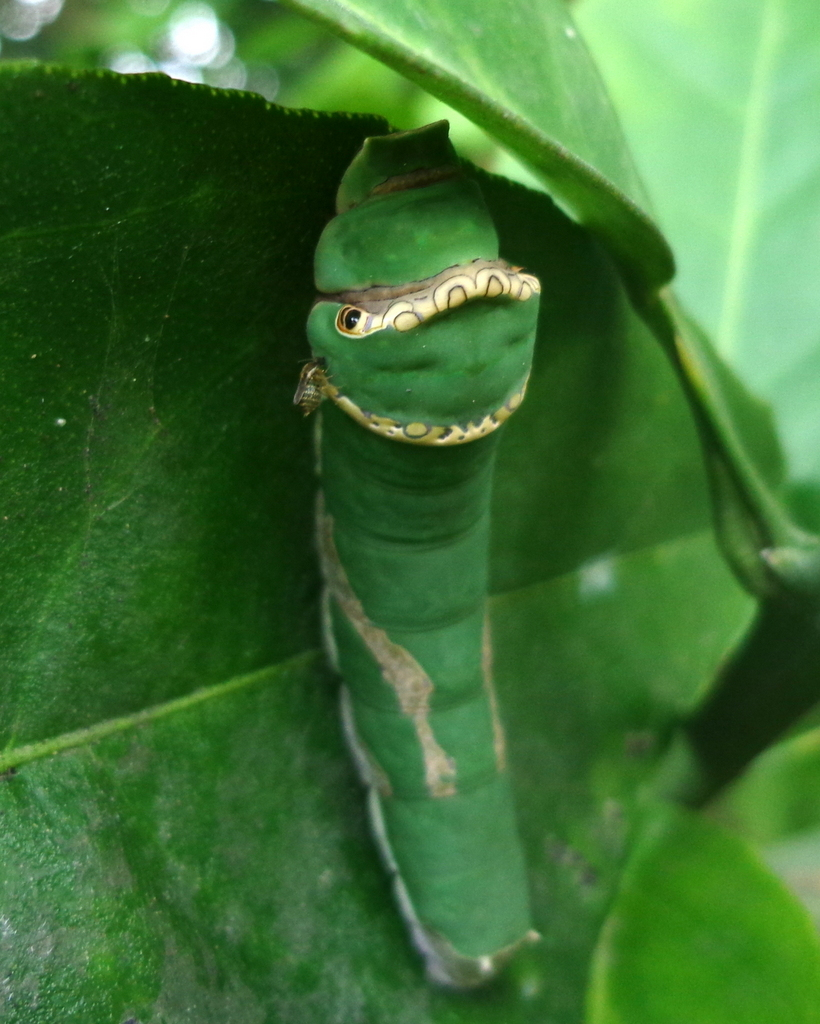
An ectoparasitic fly, cf. Ceratopogonidae, sucking blood from a larva

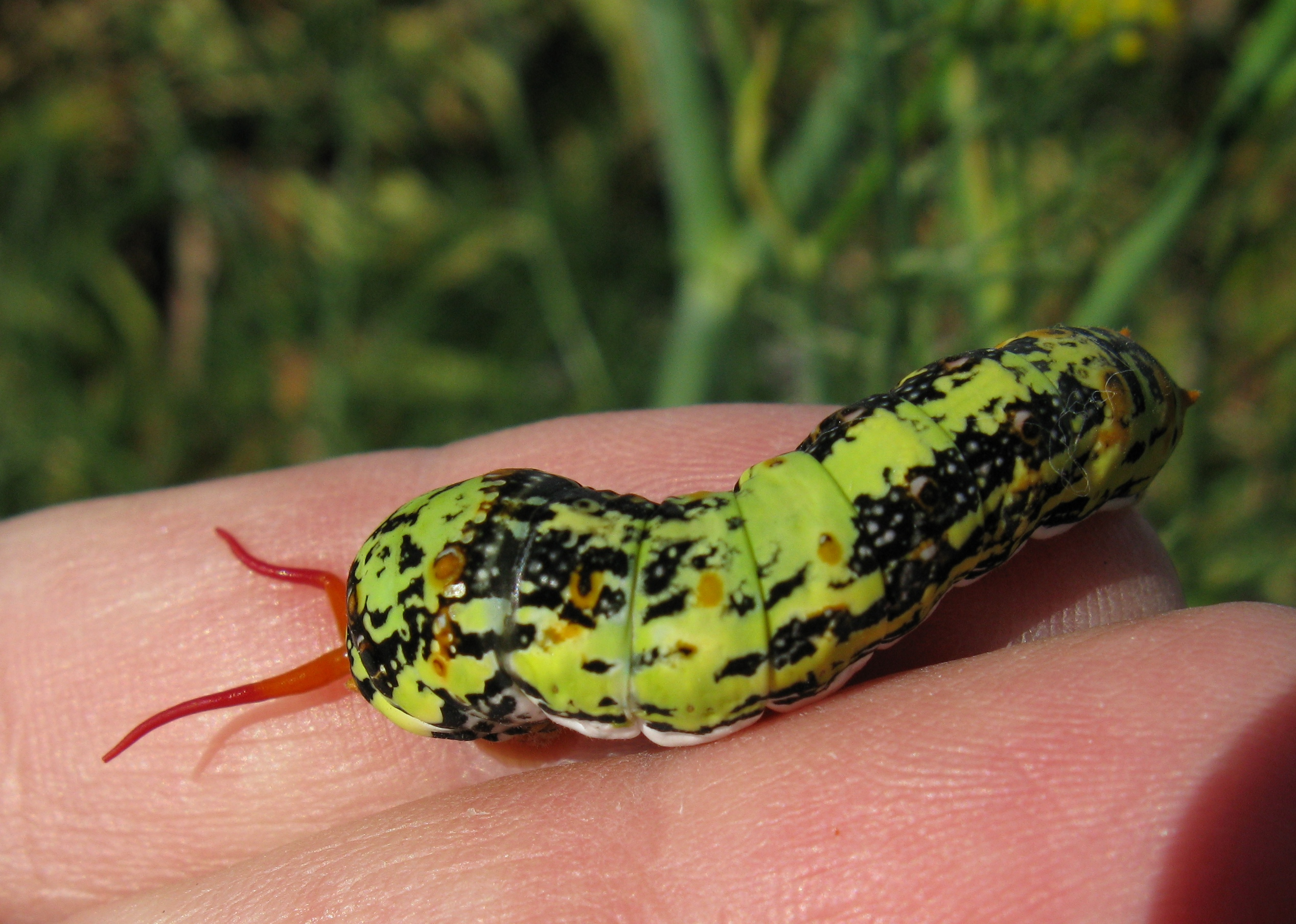
Final instar larva, osmeterium extended, applying repugnatorial secretion with one "horn" to the hand holding it.

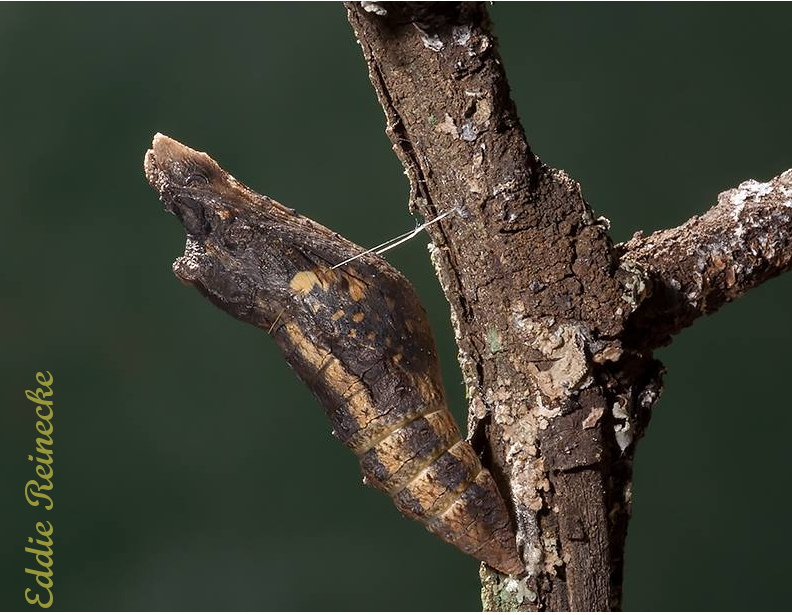
Mid-stage pupa

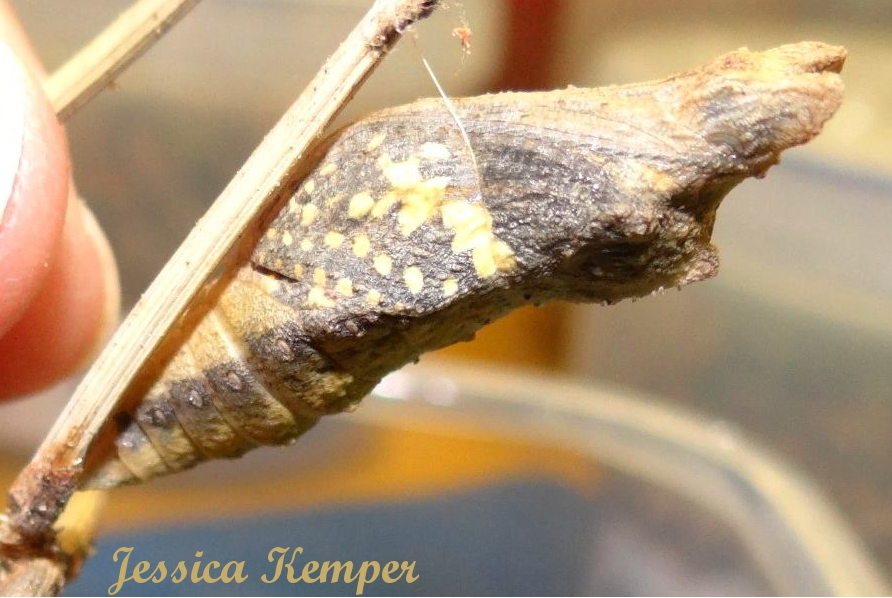
Pupa near eclosion, the colour pattern of adult visible through the skin

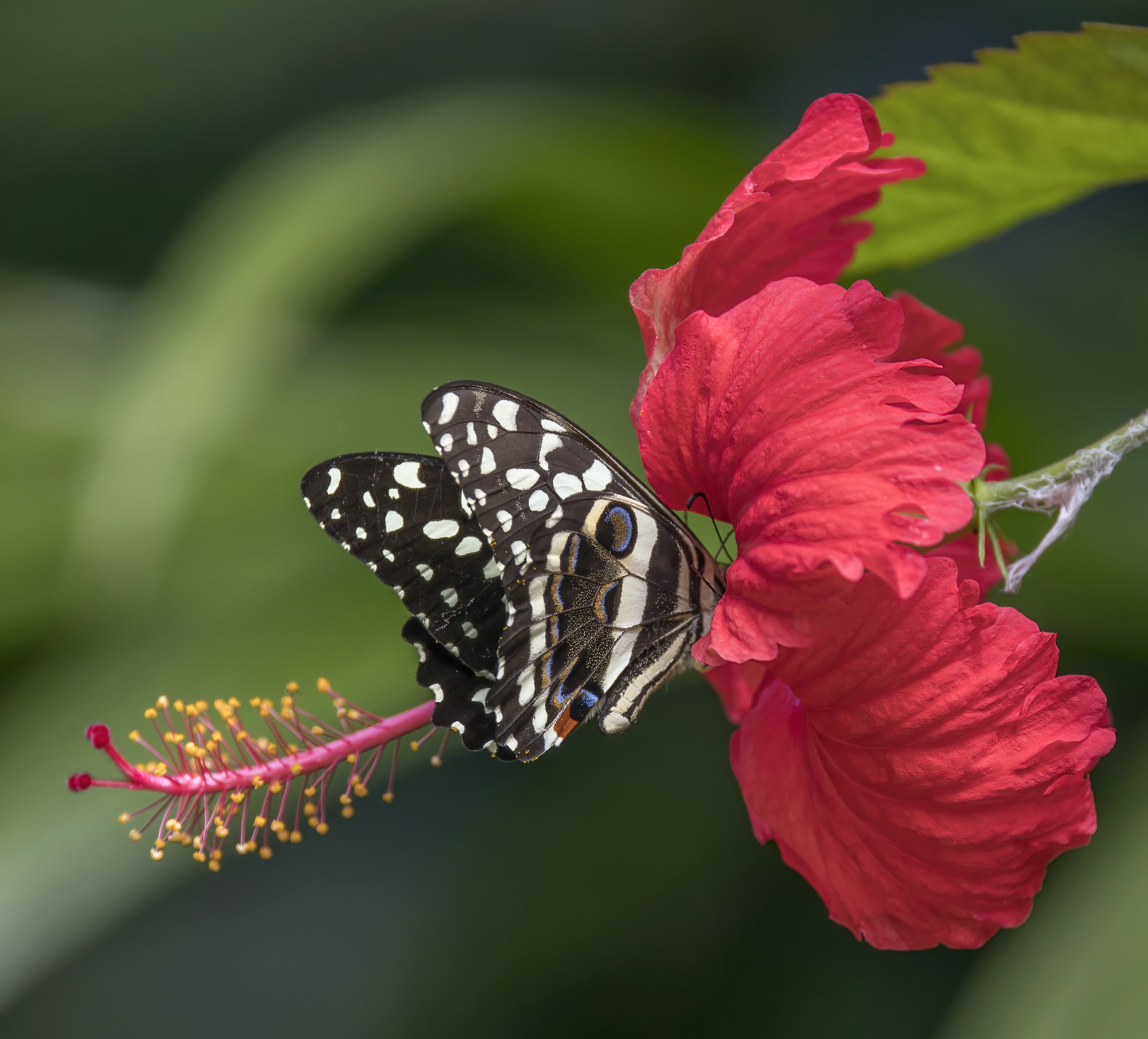
a pair nectaring on hibiscus
