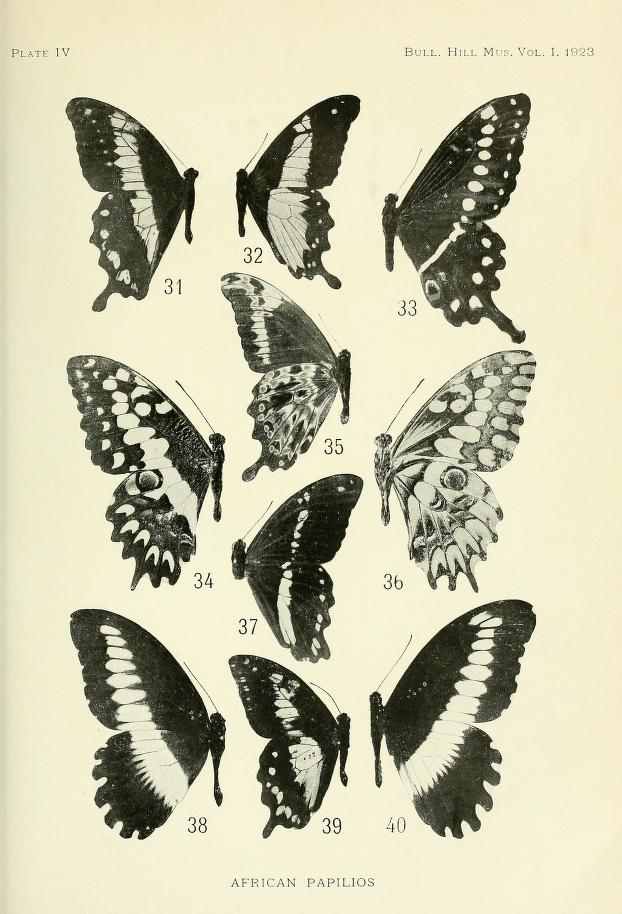
- Papilio grosesmithi, figs. 34 and 36 Bulletin of the Hill Museum

Conservation status
- Near Threatened (IUCN 2.3)

Scientific classification
- Kingdom: Animalia
- Phylum: Arthropoda
- Clade: Pancrustacea
- Class: Insecta
- Order: Lepidoptera
- Family: Papilionidae
- Genus: Papilio
- Species: P. grosesmithi

Binomial name
- Papilio grosesmithi Rothschild, 1926

Synonyms
- Papilio grose-smithi praeses Le Cerf, 1924

= Papilio grosesmithi =

Species of butterfly

Papilio grosesmithi is a species of butterfly in the family Papilionidae. It is endemic to Madagascar. The habitat consists of forests.

== Taxonomy ==
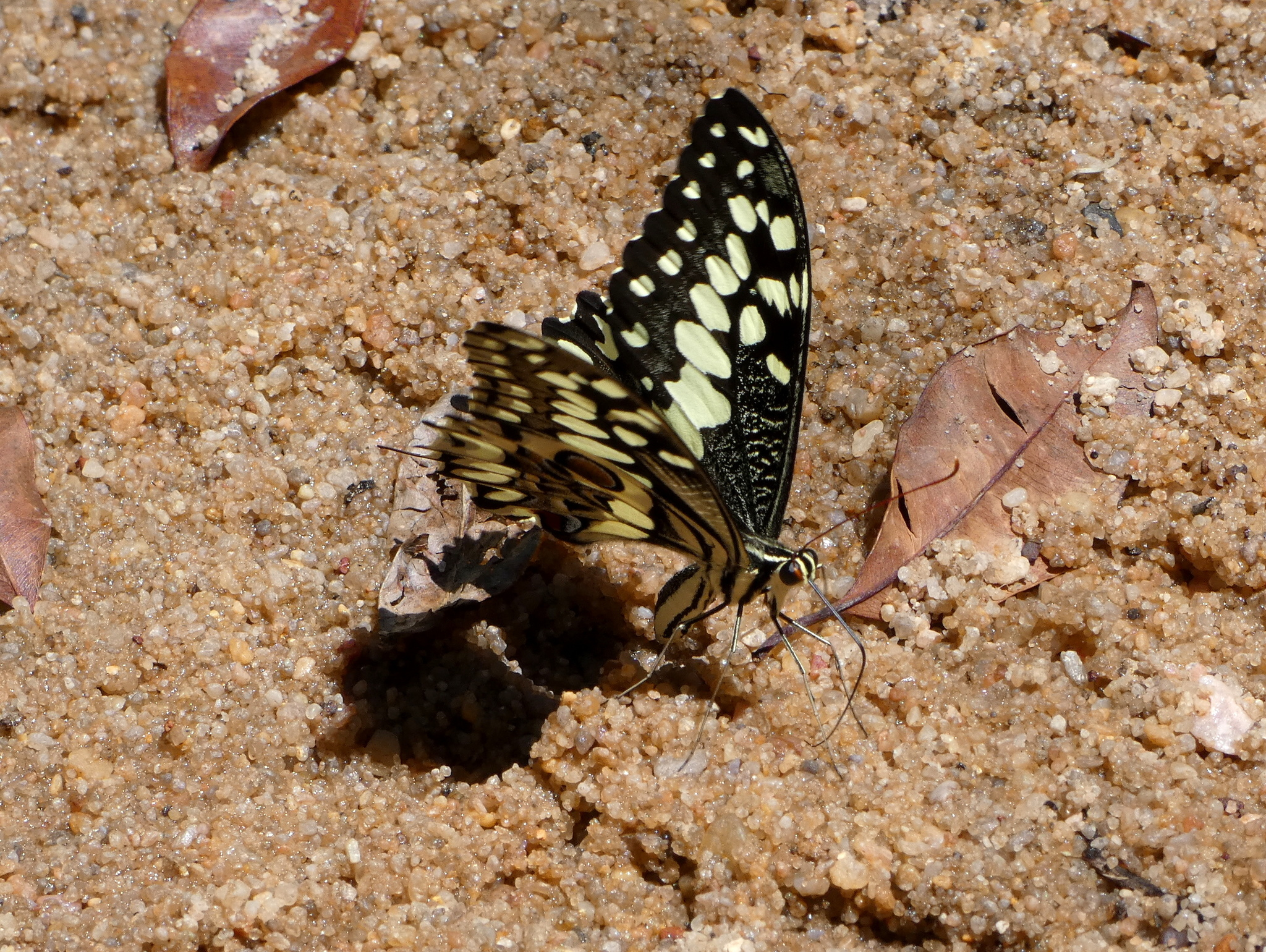
Resting

Papilio grosesmithi is a member of the demodocus species-group. The clade members are:

- Papilio demodocus Esper, 1799
- Papilio demoleus Linnaeus, 1758
- Papilio erithonioides Grose-Smith, 1891
- Papilio grosesmithi Rothschild, 1926
- Papilio morondavana Grose-Smith, 1891
