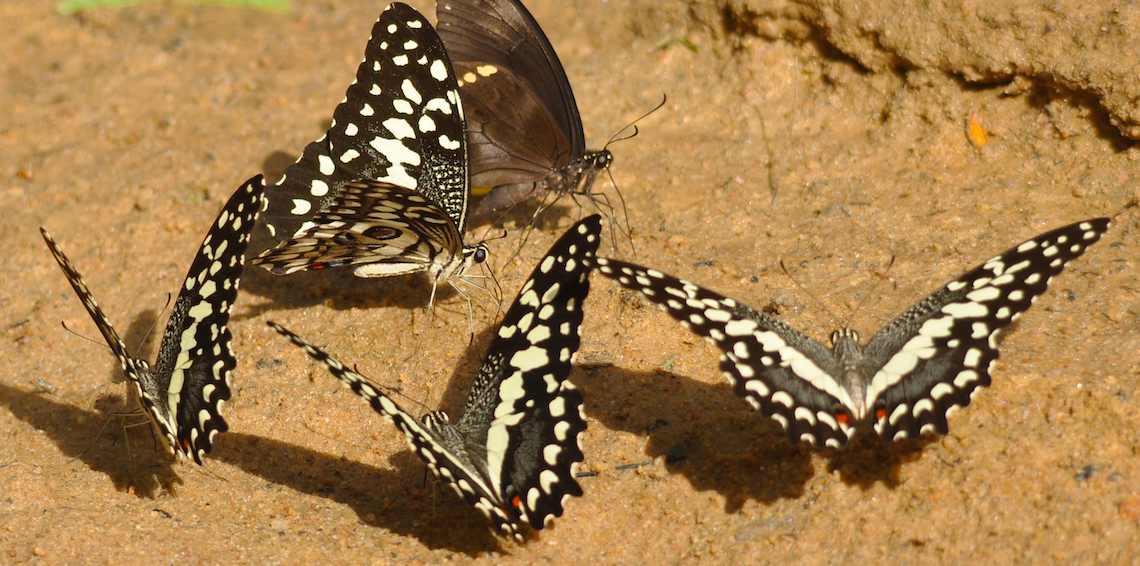

Scientific classification
- Domain: Eukaryota
- Kingdom: Animalia
- Phylum: Arthropoda
- Class: Insecta
- Order: Lepidoptera
- Family: Papilionidae
- Genus: Papilio
- Species: P. erithonioides

Binomial name
- Papilio erithonioides Grose-Smith, 1891

= Papilio erithonioides =

Species of butterfly

Papilio erithonioides is a species of swallowtail butterfly from the genus Papilio that is found in Madagascar. The habitat consists of forests.

== Original description ==
Expanse male 3 and 7/8, female 4 and 5/8 – 5 inches.

Male. Upperside. Both wings marked as in Papilio demoleus Linn., but on the posterior wings the stramineous band which crosses the wings before the middle is broader, and the spots in the submarginal row are more lunulate; at the lower end of the dark rufous spot above the anal angle is a large subovate black spot; and the middle median nervule is produced into a rather longer tail than in P. demoleus.

Underside. More resembles P. erithonius, Cram., than P. demolius but the anterior wings are more irrorated with stramineous scales, and on the posterior wings the central band is less rufous and broader than in P. erithonius the curved black line which crosses the cell near its extremity in that species is represented in P. erithonioides by a triangular black spot with the apex pointing outwards, and the irregular row of black bars which divides the central band is wider; the veins on the disk are black instead of stramineous; the ocellus below the costal nervure is larger; and at the anal angle, instead of the ferruginous spot crowned with a black spot centred with blue scales, is a dark rufous spot, with the black spot at its lower end as on the upperside, above which is a round black spot with a blue iris centred with brown. The submarginal lunules are more deeply incised on the outer side.

Female. Upperside. Nearly resembling the male, but on the posterior wings a space on each side of the large ocellus below the costal nervure is bright ferruginous. On the disk, the space between the stramineous band and the row of submarginal lunules is brightly irrorated with stramineous scales, in which, between the veins, are spaces less densely irrorated with the same colour, giving the appearance of indistinct black spots, with clusters of blue scales more or less distinct below each, resembling somewhat the mottled appearance of the posterior wings of P. ophidicephalus, Oberth. The lunules in the submarginal row are very strongly developed, the apices of each lunule being elongated towards the margin; the tail formed by the prolongation of the middle median nervule is very marked, being nearly 3/8 inch long.

Underside. All the spots on both wings larger than on the upperside. Anterior wings with the first four spots of the submarginal row confluent with those of the marginal row, and the others nearly so. Posterior wings with the apices of the submarginal lunules much elongated, almost extending to the spots of the marginal row, which are fully developed. The marginal lunules on each side of the tails extend down them almost to the extremity. Across the disk the outer row of sinuate black lines is crowned with silvery blue; and in the middle row, the irregular black spots extend inwardly in a conical shape, and are margined on the outer side by another row of bright blue scales.inside the extremity of the cell is a broad curved black spot centred with blue; the veins are black, most broadly on the margins. Both wings irrorated with stramineous scales between the spots and at the base.

Antennae rufous.

Hab. N.W. coast of Madagascar (Last). In the Collections of Henley Grose Smith, the Hon. Walter Rothschild, and others. This species is intermediate between the Asiatic P. erithonus, Cram., and the African P. demoleus Linn. Both the latter species are among the commonest butterflies in their respective countries; and the true P. Demoleus is common in Madagascar, as well as on the continent of Africa. P. erithonioides is a much larger insect than P. erithonius, and the development of the tails in the female is very remarkable. A considerable series was received.

== Taxonomy ==
Papilio erithonioides is a member of the demodocus species-group. The clade members are

- Papilio demodocus Esper, 1799
- Papilio demoleus Linnaeus, 1758
- Papilio erithonioides Grose-Smith, 1891
- Papilio grosesmithi Rothschild, 1926
- Papilio morondavana Grose-Smith, 1891
