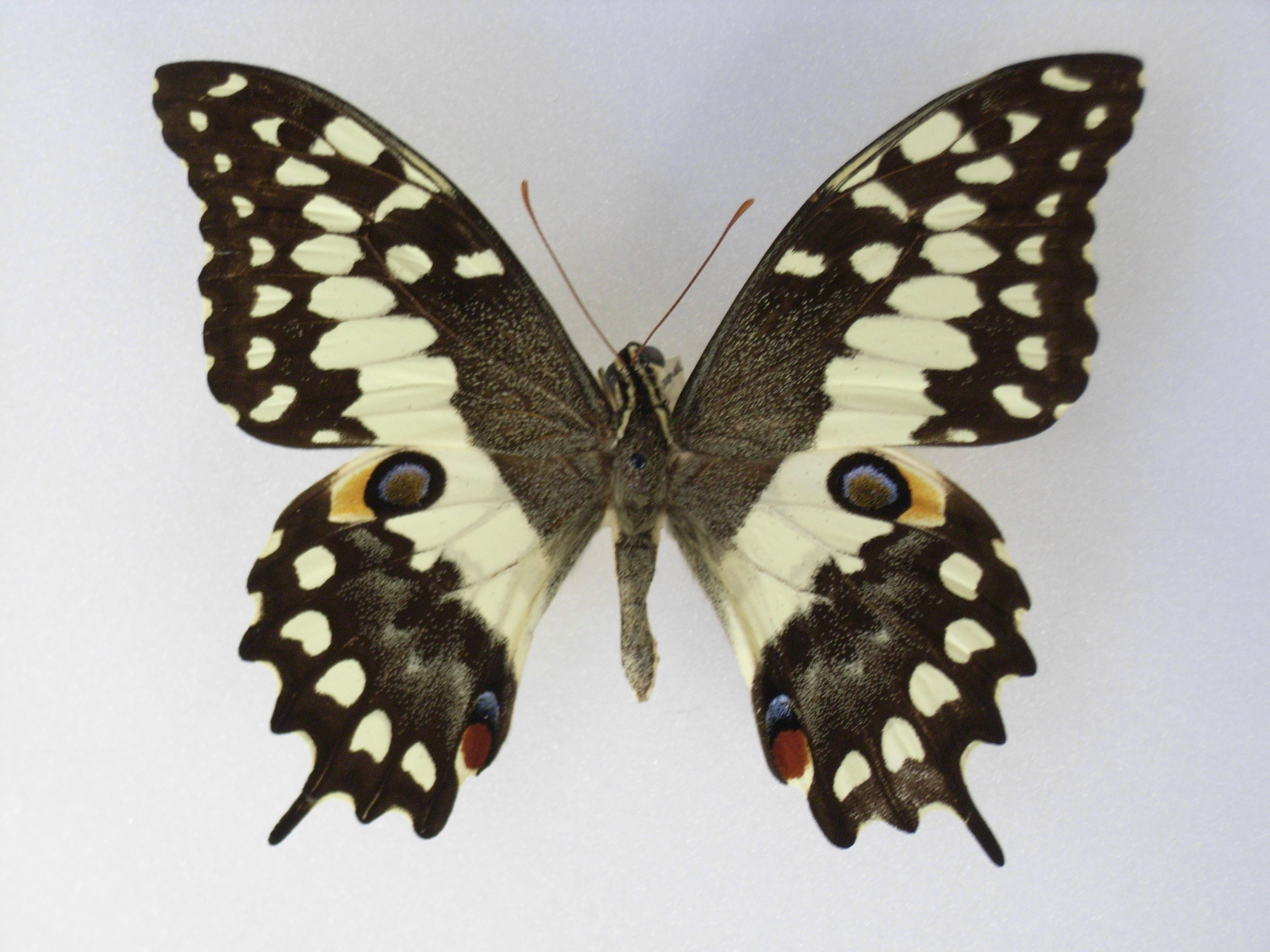
- Upperside
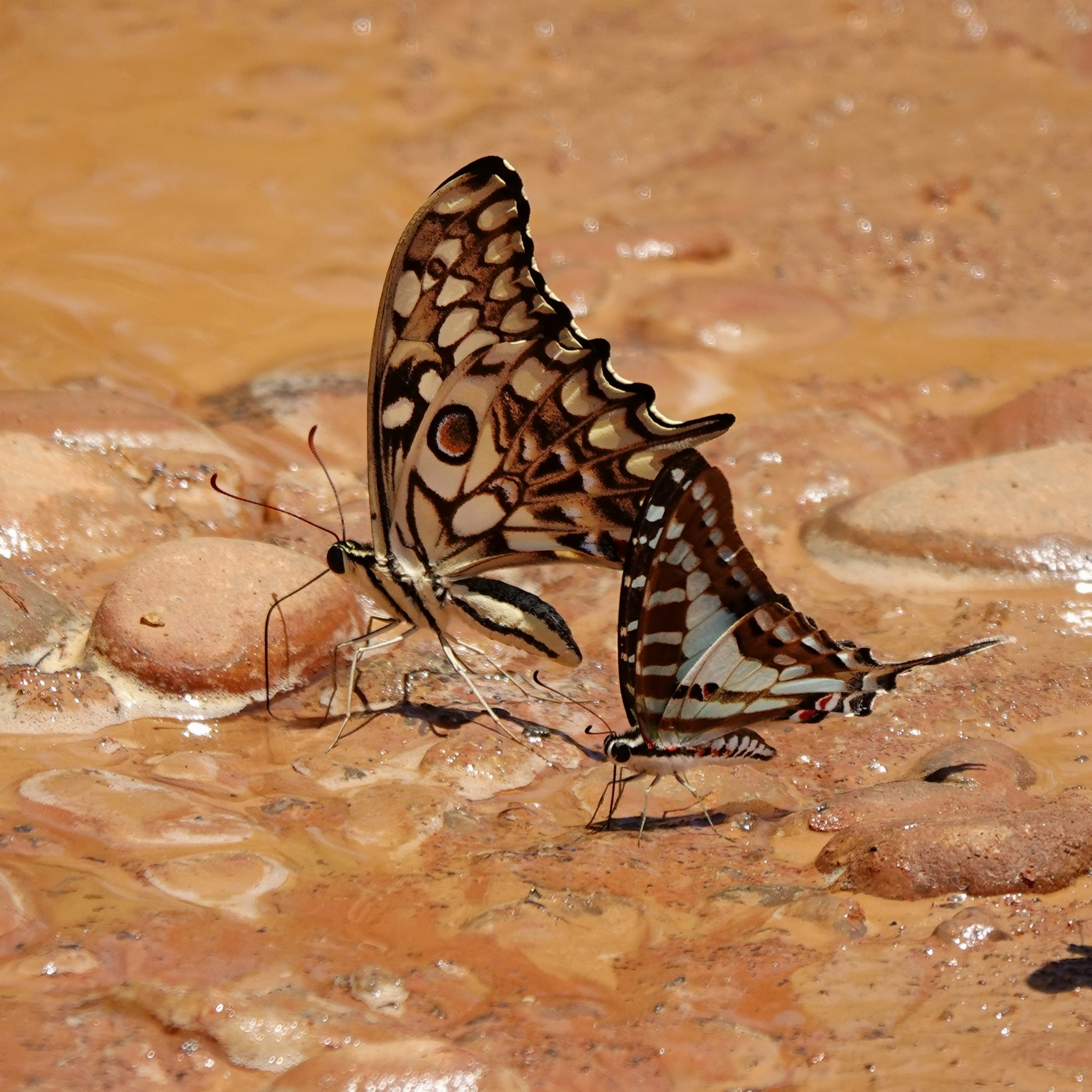
- Underside

Conservation status
- Data Deficient (IUCN 2.3)

Scientific classification
- Kingdom: Animalia
- Phylum: Arthropoda
- Class: Insecta
- Order: Lepidoptera
- Family: Papilionidae
- Genus: Papilio
- Species: P. morondavana

Binomial name
- Papilio morondavana Grose-Smith, 1891

= Papilio morondavana =

Species of butterfly

Papilio morondavana, the Madagascan emperor swallowtail, is a species of butterfly in the family Papilionidae. It is endemic to Madagascar. The habitat consists of forests.

== Original description ==
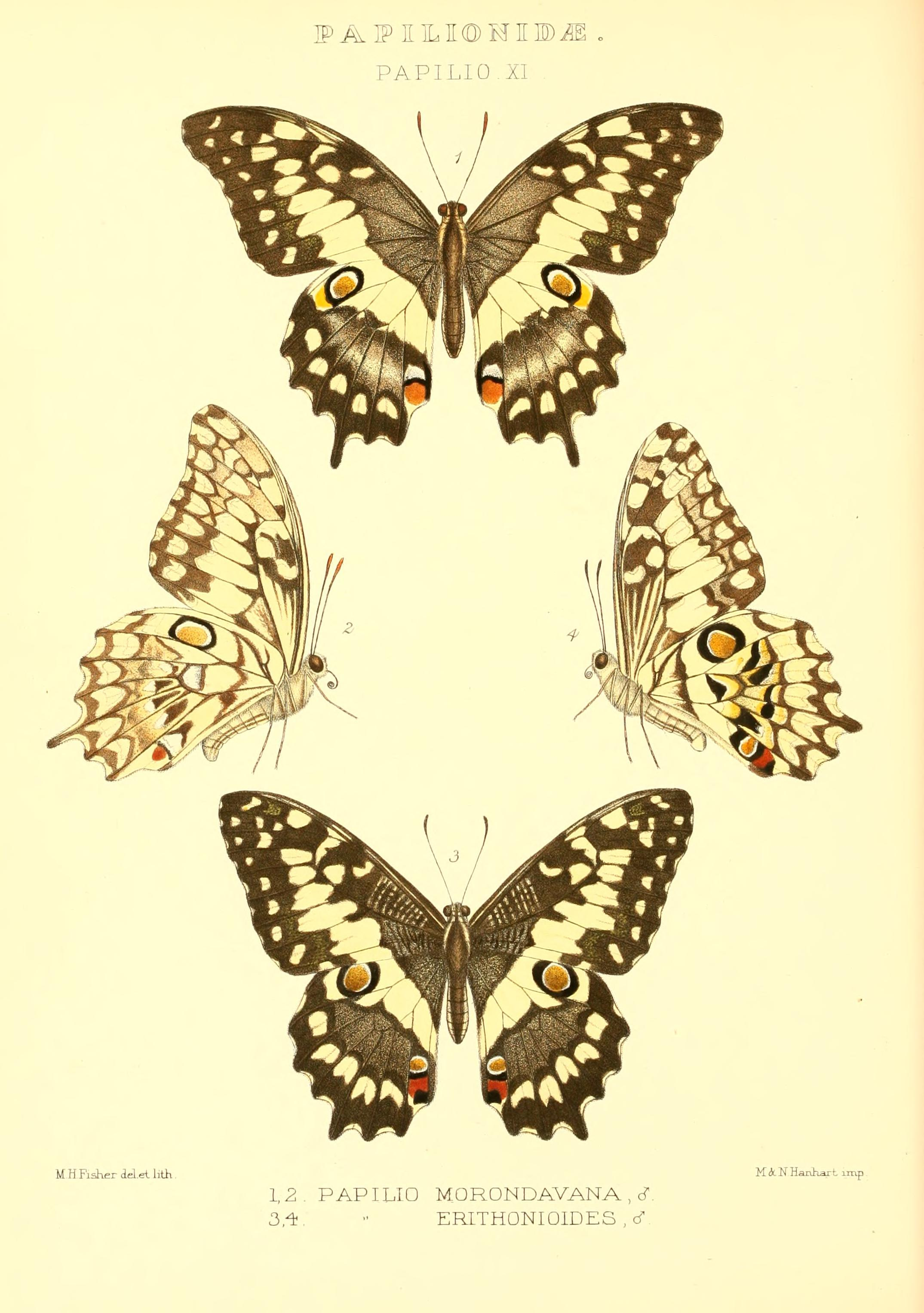
Papilio morondavana and Papilio erithonioides

Expanse male 4 and 3/8, female 4 and 3/4 inches.

Male. Upperside. Anterior wings marked nearly as in P. erithonioides, the basal third being densely irrorated with stramineous scales in lieu of the small spots or lines of the same colour arranged in nearly parallel rows in Papilio erithonioides. Posterior wings with the subbasal stramineous band broader than Papilio erithonioides, and on the costal margin extending rather broadly round the subapical ocellus, the outer part of the band between the costal and subcostal nervures being brightly ferruginous; the spots in the submarginal row are smaller and less lunulate outwardly, and the black spot at the lower end of the rufous anal spot of P. erithonioides is absent, the rufous spot of P. morondavana being rounder and paler; the space between the submarginal row and the band is more densely irrorated with stramineous scales. Underside. Resembles P. erithonioides, but paler. On the anterior wings the longitudinal stramineous bars at the base are more confluent and less elongated than in P. erithonioides. The space between the end of the cell and the third spot in the discal row of spots is densely irrorated with stramineous scales, which are absent in the corresponding space in P. erithonioides. On the posterior wings the dark markings are less conspicuous, and the subapical ocellus is more elongate-ovate, and surrounded with a narrower black line than in P. erithonioides: on the disk in the spaces between the nervules, and surrounding the outer part of the cell, is an irregular row of triangular black markings (the two uppermost hastate) bordered outwardly with ill-defined silvery bluish-white spots; the submarginal spots are more conical, and nearer the margin; the marginal lunules are narrower and more elongate, those on each side of the tail extending down nearly to its end; the rufous anal spot is sharply triangular, with the apex downwards, instead of being quadrangular with a black bar below; the space above the rufous spot is silvery bluish-white. The antennae of both sexes are red, as are those of the female of P. erithonioides; the antennae of the male of the latter, and of both sexes of P. demoleus are black.

Female. Resembles the male, but larger.

Hab. Mahabo, Marondava River, S.W. Madagascar (Last). In the Collections of Henley Grose Smith and the Hon. Walter Rothschild. Allied to P. Demoleus, Linn., and Papilio erithonioides, Grose Smith; but the anterior wings are narrower, more curved on the costal margin, and more concave on the outer margin. The posterior wings have a tail 3/4 inch long in both sexes. It is interesting to meet with two such very distinct species in Madagascar of a small group like that of P. Demoleus, which is widely distributed, but includes very few species, and these by no means remarkably variable. P. Marondavana was captured in the above locality only, while P. Erithonioides occurred in nearly every locality visited by Mr. Last on his journey down the West Coast as far south as Salarv.
