= Psoralea pilifera =

Scientific classification
- Kingdom: Plantae
- Clade: Embryophytes
- Clade: Tracheophytes
- Clade: Angiosperms
- Clade: Eudicots
- Clade: Rosids
- Order: Fabales
- Family: Fabaceae
- Subfamily: Faboideae
- Genus: Psoralea
- Species: P. pilifera

Binomial name
- Psoralea pilifera (C.H.Stirt. & Muasya) C.H.Stirt.

Synonyms
- Otholobium piliferum C.H.Stirt. & Muasya

Species of plant endemic to South Africa

Psoralea pilifera, synonym Otholobium piliferum, is a small, softly hairy shrublet of up to 30 cm (12 in) high that has been assigned to the Pea family, with branches horizontal at the base with rising tips. It regrows from the underground rootstock after fire destroys the vegetation. It has clover-like leaves on short stalks and white, pea-like flowers flushed with mauve that grow in triplets in the axils of the upper leaves of the new shoots. The species is only known from near Makhanda, Eastern Cape province of South Africa. Flowers have been seen in September and January. This is a very rare species about which little is known and which is likely threatened with extinction.

== Description ==
Psoralea pilifera is a small shrub, with branches that are horizontal at the base and rise at the tips. It regrows from its rootstock after fire destroys the above ground vegetation. It has many slender, striped stems of up to 30 cm (12 in) long that are covered in soft hairs that are pressed against the bark. The leaves have 2 stipules of 4–5 mm (0.16–0.20 in) long rimmed by a line of hairs, that are narrowly awl-shaped at the base of the earliest leaves but broadly awl-shaped at the highest leaves on the shoot. Between these is a common stalk of 2–4 mm (0.079–0.157 in) and each of the three leaflets is on an individual stalk of 0.75–1 mm (0.030–0.039 in) long. Initially, the upright leaflets are somewhat hairy but these hairs are quickly shed. The leaflets are also adorned with sunken glands that are less obvious on the lower surface. On the lower surface, the veins are conspicuous. The tip of the leaflets is pointy with the middle vein extending from the leaf blade into a straight hair-thin point, while the base is wedge-shaped. The leaflets are unequal in size and shape. The central leaflet is inverted egg-shape, 10–13 mm (0.39–0.51 in) long and 3–5 mm (0.12–0.20 in) wide. The leaflets to the side are smaller and asymmetrical with the outer margin curved and the inner margin almost straight.

The flowers are grouped with three together on a stalk (or peduncle) of 4 mm (0.16 in) long, predominantly in the leaf axils on upper two thirds of new growth and are subtended by an oblong to oval, irregularly toothed, fan-shaped yellowish bract of about 3 mm (0.12 in) long. The pea-like flowers are 8–9 mm (0.31–0.35 in) long, on the tip of flower stalks (or pedicels of about 3 mm long. Each individual flower is subtended by a 3 mm long, hood-shaped, narrowly lance-shaped bract. The calyx is longer than the corolla at 8–10 mm (0.31–0.39 in) and is merged at its base in a tube of about 3 mm (0.12 in) long and extends into five free, unequal teeth with pointy tips, weak ribs, silky hairy along the margin and fine glands, mostly on the tube. The tooth neighbouring the keel is longer than the others at 6.5–7 mm (0.26–0.28 in) long and 2.5–3 mm (0.098–0.118 in) wide, with a pointed tip, the teeth neighbouring the standard shortest and not fused with each other above rim of the tube, and the side teeth intermediate. As in most Faboideae, the corolla is zygomorphic, forms a specialized structure and consists of five free petals. The corolla is white flushed with mauve. The upper petal, called the banner or standard, is elliptic, 9–10 mm (0.35–0.39 in) long, with a blunt tip and it narrows down to two lobes facing the base, and extending down between the lobes into a narrow part called claw of about 2 mm (0.079 in) long. The two side petals called wings are 8–9 mm (0.31–0.35 in) long and about 2 mm (0.079 in) wide. The blade of the wing is adorned with up to 10 ridges and has one lobe or auricle facing the base. The claw of the wing is 2–3 mm (0.079–0.118 in). The wings largely hides the two keel petals that are attached at the bottom and form a boat shape of about 6 mm (0.24 in) long and 1.5 mm (0.059 in) high, with its base curling upwards and claws of about 3 mm (0.12 in) long. The keel envelops a tube of 6–6.5 mm (0.24–0.26 in) long formed by 9 largely merged filaments and the upper filament almost entirely free. This so called androecium in turn encloses the pistil of 5–5.5 mm (0.20–0.22 in) long, that consists of a stalk or gynophore of about 0.4 mm (0.016 in) long, the ovary of 1.25–1.5 mm (0.049–0.059 in) long that is adorned with few stalked glands, a hairless style that is thickened most where it curves upwards about 1.5 mm (0.059 in) under the brush-shaped stigma. The fruits and seeds have not been described so far.

=== Likeness to other species ===
Psoralea pilifera is strongly reminiscent of P. bolusii, which is also about 30 cm high, has leaves consisting of 3 unequal leaflets, those at the sides asymmetrical, and stipules that are silky or fringed with hairs, but this species has a distribution far to the west.

== Taxonomy ==
As far as known, this species was collected by Thomas Robertson Sim in 1892, and again in 1914 by Bulcock, but has not been found since. Charles Stirton and A. Muthama Muasya considered it sufficiently different from its relatives, described it in 2017, and called it Otholobium piliferum. The name of the genus Otholobium is a combination of the Greek words ὠθέω (ōthéō) meaning to push and λοβός (lobos) meaning pod, which Stirton selected because its fruit seems to be pushed out of the calyx. The species name piliferum is compounded from the Latin words pilus (hair) and ferō (I bear), together meaning carrying hairs. In 2022, Stirton sank the Southern African species of the genus Otholobium into Psoralea, and this species became Psoralea pilifera.

== Distribution and ecology ==
Psoralea pilifera grows on the eastern margin of the typical fynbos biome, in patches of Bhisho Thornveld and Suurberg Shale Fynbos. Its distribution is disjunct from that of all other species in this genus.
