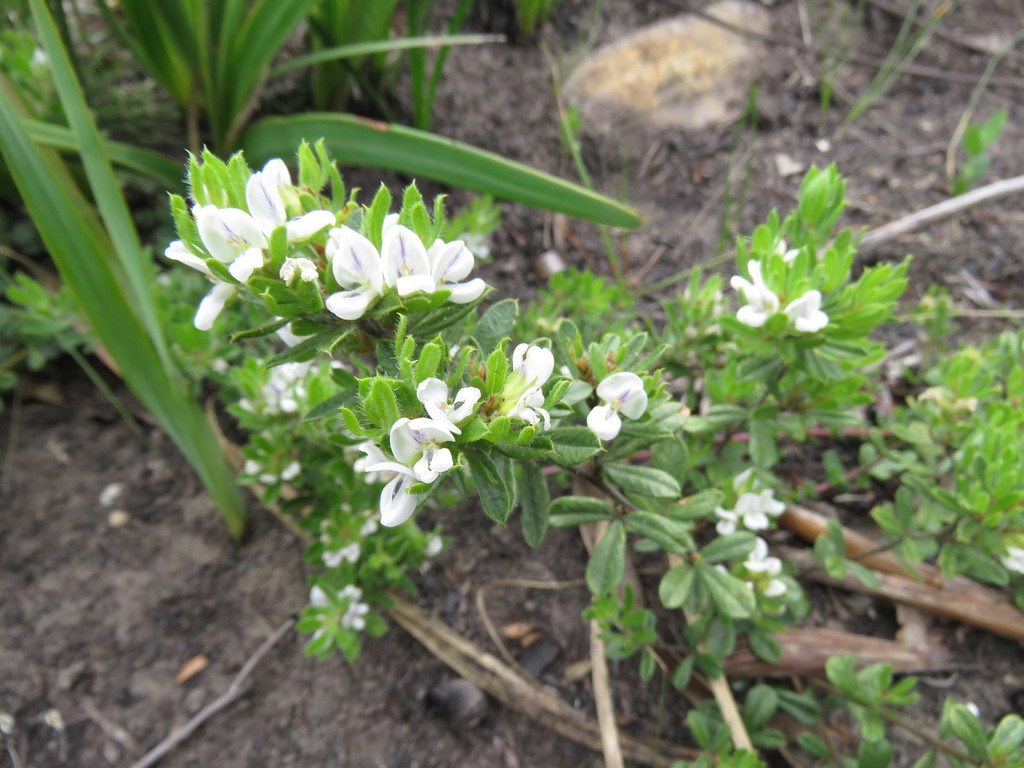

Conservation status
- Endangered (SANBI Red List)

Scientific classification
- Kingdom: Plantae
- Clade: Embryophytes
- Clade: Tracheophytes
- Clade: Angiosperms
- Clade: Eudicots
- Clade: Rosids
- Order: Fabales
- Family: Fabaceae
- Subfamily: Faboideae
- Genus: Psoralea
- Species: P. saxosa

Binomial name
- Psoralea saxosa (C.H.Stirt. & Muasya) C.H.Stirt.

Synonyms
- Otholobium saxosum C.H.Stirt. & Muasya

= Psoralea saxosa =

Species of plant endemic to South Africa

Psoralea saxosa is a small shrublet of up to 20 cm (7.9 in) high that has been assigned to the Pea family, with branches upright or horizontal at the base with rising tips. It has sessile, clover-like leaves and white, pea-like flowers that grow in triplets in the axils of the upper leaves of new, short side shoots. The species is only known from Garcia's Pass in Western Cape province of South Africa. Flowering occurs in October and November.

== Description ==
Psoralea saxosa is a small shrublet of up to 20 cm (7.9 in) high, with branches upright or horizontal at the base with rising tips. The side branches are slender and covered in straight, soft, spreading or erect hairs and warts. The leaves have pointy, hairless, striped, awl-shaped stipules of 2–3 mm (0.079–0.118 in) long that clasp the stem at the base of a common stalk of less than 2 mm long and each of the three leaflets is on an individual stalk of about 1 mm (0.039 in) long. Initially, the leaflets are somewhat softly hairy but these hairs are quickly shed. The leaflets have sunken glands that are more obvious on the upper surface. The central leaflet is narrowly inverted egg-shaped, mostly 12–15 mm (0.47–0.59 in) long and 4–7 mm (0.16–0.28 in) wide. The side leaflets are smaller, asymmetrical, with the inner margin approximately straight and the outer margin curved. The secondary veins are weakly developed. The tip of the leaflets is pointy or blunt, but the middle vein always extends from the leaf blade into a straight point.

The flowers are crowded on new, short side shoots in triplets in the axils of the upper leaves. Each triplet of flowers sit on a inflorescence stalk and is subtended by an inverted lanceolate to fan-shaped bract of 3–3.5 mm (0.12–0.14 in) long with many veins. Each individual flower is subtended by 1 or 2 narrowly lanceolate bracts and sits on about 2 mm (0.079 in) long flower stalk. The pea-like flowers are 9–10 mm (0.35–0.39 in) long. The calyx is shorter that the corolla and merged at its base in a bell-shaped tube of 2–2.5 mm (0.079–0.098 in) long and extends into five free, unequal, roughly hairy, lance-shaped to broadly lance-shaped teeth with pointy tips, prominent veins and a row of hairs along the margins. The tooth at the bottom of the flower next to the keel is longer and wider than the others at about 8 mm (0.31 in) long and 1.8–2 mm (0.071–0.079 in) wide. The two teeth next to the standard have fused for 1 mm above the rim of the tube. Small, scattered glands are present mostly on the teeth. As in most Faboideae, the corolla is zygomorphic, forms a specialized structure and consists of five free petals. The upper petal, called the banner or standard is elliptic, approximately 9 mm (0.35 in) long and 6 mm (0.24 in) wide. The wider part at the top called the blade is white with a narrow violet flash that serves as a nectar guide and it narrows down to two lobes facing the base, and extending down between the lobes into a narrow part called claw of about 2 mm (0.079 in) long. The two side petals called wings are 9 mm (0.35 in) long and 2 mm (0.079 in) wide. The blade of the wing is adorned with 10-12 ridges and has one lobe or auricle facing the base. The claw of the wing is about 2 mm (0.079 in) long. The two keel petals not only stick together along their base but also cling to the wing petals with the auricles. The keel petals are about 6 mm (0.24 in) long and 2 mm (0.079 in) wide, with the keel claw about 2 mm (0.079 in) long. The keel envelops a hollow, open tube of 5–5.5 mm (0.20–0.22 in) long, made up of nine merged filaments and one free stamen. Largely hidden in this androecium is an approximately 5 mm (0.20 in) long pistil, including at its base a gynophore of about 0.4 mm (0.016 in) long that carries the ovary of 1–1.3 mm (0.039–0.051 in) long that is adorned with few multi-celled glands. At the tip, the ovary extends into a hairless style that strongly widens at the place where it curves upwards about 1.5 mm from its end. The style is topped by a pinhead-shaped stigma. Fruits and seeds were unknown at the time of the description of this species.

=== Differences with related species ===
Psoralea saxosa differs from P. polyphylla, which is a taller, bushy, upright shrub (not a small, more or less upright or ascending shrublet), with obliquely oblong leaflets (not inverted egg-shaped), pointy oval stipules (not awl-shaped), flowers of 6–7 mm long with an oval standard (not 9–10 mm with an elliptic standard), calyx teeth next to the standard that are fused over two-thirds of their length (not fused for only 1 mm) and an oblong bract subtending each triplet of flowers (not narrowly lance-shaped). P. bowieana is the only other species in this genus with white flowers, stalkless, clover-like leaves and asymmetrical side leaflets that also grows on Garcia's Pass and the adjacent mountains. It however differs from Otholobium saxosum in having 8–10 mm wide leaflets (not 4–7 mm wide), that are slightly roughly hairy when young (not slightly softly hairy), a hooked extension of the midvein (not straight), flowers in open inflorescences above the leaves (not hidden between the leaves) and the calyx teeth neighbouring the standard partially fused (not only fused for 1 mm).

== Taxonomy ==
As far as known, this species was first collected by the famous South African botanist Harry Bolus in 1904. Charles Stirton and A. Muthama Muasya considered it sufficiently different from its relatives, described it in 2017, and called it Otholobium saxosum. The name of the genus Otholobium is a combination of the Greek words ὠθέω (ōthéō) meaning to push and λοβός (lobos) meaning pod, which Stirton selected because its fruit seems to be pushed out of the calyx. The species name saxosum means stony and refers to the rocky terrain where it naturally grows. In 2022 Stirton concluded that Otholobium is a synonym of Psoralea and renamed the species P. saxosa.

== Conservation, distribution and ecology ==
Psoralea saxosa is considered an endangered species because less than 250 mature specimens can be found at the two locations where it is known to grow. Some habitat of this species has been lost to invasive alien plants and forestry plantations, but the decline has currently halted. It a pyrophytic species that can only be found flowering a few years following a fire. It is known from the Langeberg Mountains, in particular the surroundings of the Toll House at Garcia's Pass where it grows in a vegetation type called mountain fynbos on moist loamy soils on slopes facing south at an elevation of about 600 m (2,000 ft).
