= Psoralea accrescens =

Conservation status
- Near Threatened (SANBI Red List)

Scientific classification
- Kingdom: Plantae
- Clade: Embryophytes
- Clade: Tracheophytes
- Clade: Angiosperms
- Clade: Eudicots
- Clade: Rosids
- Order: Fabales
- Family: Fabaceae
- Subfamily: Faboideae
- Genus: Psoralea
- Species: P. accrescens

Binomial name
- Psoralea accrescens (C.H.Stirt. & Muasya) C.H.Stirt.

Synonyms
- Otholobium accrescens C.H.Stirt. & Muasya

Species of plant endemic to South Africa

Psoralea accrescens is an upright, largely herbaceous subshrub assigned to the Pea family. It has up to three stems that carry upright branches in leaf axils near the ground, and have alternately set inverted egg-shaped leaves and lax heads consisting of 12–21 pea-like flowers on long peduncles in the axils of the lower leaves. It differs from most other Psoralea species by the calyx that continues to grow after flowering and the leaf that consists of just one leaflet. It is an endemic of the Eastern Cape province of South Africa near Loerie. It probably flowers August to January.

== Taxonomy ==
Specimens of the species have been collected since 1947. Charles Stirton and A. Muthama Muasya considered it sufficiently different from its relatives, described it in 2017, and called it Otholobium accrescens. The name of the genus Otholobium is a combination of the Greek words ὠθέω (ōthéō) meaning to push and λοβός (lobos) meaning pod, which Stirton selected because its fruit seems to be pushed out of the calyx. The species name accrēscēns is Latin, means growing or increasing, and refers to the characteristic that the calyx continues to grow after flowering. In 2022 Stirton determined that Otholobium is a synonym of Psoralea, and placed the species in genus Psoralea as P. accrescens.

== Description ==
Psoralea accrescens is a small, upright, largely herbaceous subshrub of up 10–60 cm (3.9–23.6 in) high, that resprouts from the underground rootstock, after a fire destroyed the above ground biomass, by growing up to 3 stems at an interval from one another. These stems carry upright branches in the axils of the lower leaves. At the base of the alternately set leaves are two, spreading or back curving stipules of 4–5 mm (0.16–0.20 in) long and 1–2.5 mm (0.039–0.098 in) wide that are slightly club-shaped lower down the stem and line- to awl-shaped higher up, hairless but set with dot-like glands. In contrast to most Psoralea species, the leaf only consists of one leaflet. The ancestral clover-like leaf can still be deduced from the fact that the petiole of 5–8 mm (0.20–0.31 in) long is topped by a petiolule of about 1 mm (0.039 in) long that can be shed separately. It in turn carries the single leaflet that can also be shed separately. The first leaflets to appear are smaller than those higher up the stem. The hairless leaflets are broadly elliptic to broadly inverted egg-shaped, 2.5–4 cm (0.98–1.57 in) long and 1.5–2.5 cm (0.59–0.98 in) wide, with a wedge-shaped base, a round top, but the central veins is very slightly elongated, sharp, hook-shaped. The leaflet has a smooth margin, and veins clearly visible on both surfaces. Dried leaflets are densely set with black dot-like glands, more so on the upper surface.

The open inflorescences emerge on 70–110 mm (2.8–4.3 in) long peduncles (4–5 times longer than the subtending leaf) from the axils of the lower leaves. The inflorescences themselves are 35–55 mm (1.4–2.2 in) long, and carry between 4–7 clusters of three flowers each that are borne on approximately 2 mm (0.079 in) long pedicels. Each flower cluster is subtended by a broadly oval, papery bract, that carries few hairs and is not shed. The flowers are about 10 mm (0.39 in) long, and are each subtended by a small, needle-shaped, persistent bract. The calyx is merged in a funnel-shaped tube of 3–3.3 mm (0.12–0.13 in) long but ends in five equally long teeth of about 10 mm long with a pointy tip. The tooth at the bottom of the flower is slightly broader at about 3 mm (0.12 in) wide. The four other teeth are lance-shaped, with the edges approximately parallel towards the tube and both lobes at the upside of the flower are fused further than rest. The calyx has a netted pattern of veins, equally sized and equally distributed dot-like glands, and a row of blackish hairs along the edge. The calyx continues to grow after flowering. As in most Faboideae, the corolla is zygomorphic, forms a specialized structure and consists of 5 free petals, of at the moment unknown colour because the species was described from dried specimens, the colour has not been documented when it was collected, and no flowering plants have been observed in the field so far. The upper petal, called the banner or standard is broadly elliptic, approximately 11 mm (0.43 in) long and 3 mm (0.12 in) wide, with a wider part at the top called the blade narrowing down to 2 lobes facing the base, and extending down between the lobes into a narrow part called claw of about 2 mm (0.079 in) long. The two side petals called wings are 2.5 mm (0.098 in) long and 1.1 mm (0.043 in) wide, curve upwards, and overlap the keel. The blade of the wing is adorned with about 35 irregular ridges in indistinct rows and has one lobe or auricle facing the base. The claw of the wing is about 3 mm (0.12 in) long. The 2 keel petals stick together along their base and are about 8 mm (0.31 in) long and 4–4.5 mm (0.16–0.18 in) wide, with the keel claw about 4.5 mm (0.18 in) long. The keel envelops a hollow, open tube of about 8 mm (0.31 in) long, made up of 9 merged filaments and 1 free stamen, all of them equally long. Largely hidden in this androecium is a 7–8 mm (0.28–0.31 in) long pistil, including at its base the ovary of about 2.5 mm (0.098 in) long that is adorned with adpressed black hairs and many glands. At the tip the ovary extends into a forward sloping style that is thickened at the place where it curves upwards about 2–3 mm from its end. The pistil it topped by a small stigma. The pistil later develops into the densely glandular, 8 mm (0.31 in) and 6.5 mm (0.26 in) thick pod. The single seed is about 5 mm (0.20 in) long and 4 mm (0.16 in) wide, dark brown in colour, with the area where it was attached, the hilum, protruding.

=== Differences with related species ===
Psoralea accrescens differs from P. afra and P. fumea, which are shrubs of up to 1.5 m (4 ft 11 in) high (not a plant of 10 to 60 cm, only woody at the base), with clover-like leaves consisting of 3 flat leaflets (not with only one leaflet), and sepals shorter than the petals (not equally long sepals and petals).

== Conservation, distribution and ecology ==
Psoralea accrescens is known from only two locations. Nonetheless, it is considered a near-threatened species that is likely more common because it is easily overlooked and is probably only noticed in the months after a fire. It occurs near the Groendal and Otterford Forest Reserves, in the Eastern Cape province of South Africa. Specimens of this species may live for over 50 years and the plants resproute from the underground rootstock after fire has destroyed the biomass above the ground. It grows in a vegetation type called mountain fynbos at an elevation of 550–650 m (1,800–2,130 ft). Flowers may be found from August to January. It produces few seeds and probably primarily propagates through its rootstocks.
