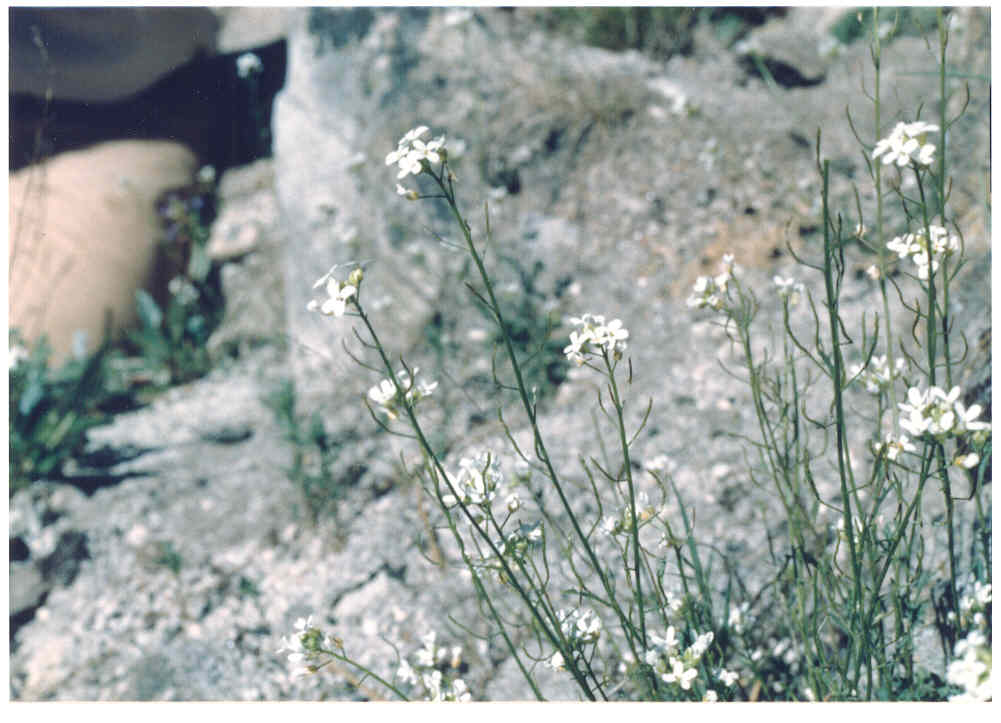
- Halimolobos perplexa (synonym of Sandbergia perplexa)

Scientific classification
- Kingdom: Plantae
- Clade: Tracheophytes
- Clade: Angiosperms
- Clade: Eudicots
- Clade: Rosids
- Order: Brassicales
- Family: Brassicaceae
- Genus: Sandbergia; Greene

= Sandbergia =

Genus of flowering plant

Sandbergia is a genus of flowering plants belonging to the family Brassicaceae. They are also in the Boechereae Tribe.

== Description ==
They are biennials or perennial plants. They have a caudex (plant stem) which is simple or branched and covered with persistent leaf remains. It is pubescent (covered in down or soft hairs) throughout. The trichomes (hair or bristles) have short stalks or are subsessile, cruciform (cross shaped), Y-shaped, or forked. The stems are erect or decumbent (having branches growing horizontally), unbranched or branched distally. The leaves are basal (at the base) or cauline (on the stem). They are petiolate (with a stalk) or sessile (stalkless). The basal leaves are usually rosulate (arranged in rosettes), petiolate, with the blade margins entire, dentate (toothed), or lyrate-pinnatifid (lyre shaped or pinnately divided) with the apex obtuse to acute (pointed). The cauline leaves are sessile, with the blade (base attenuate (narrowing gradually) and not auriculate (ear shaped), the margins are entire (smooth), subentire, dentate, or pinnatifid. The racemes are ebracteate (lacking bracts), and corymbose (having branches arising at different points but reaching about the same height, giving the flower cluster, a flat-topped appearance) and several-flowered. They are considerably elongated when in fruit. The fruiting pedicels (flower stalks) are ascending to subdivaricate, straight, slender and terete (circular in cross-section). The flowers have erect sepals which are oblong (shaped). It has white petals, which can have a pink tinge or veining, which are oblanceolate-spatulate (spoon shaped) and longer than sepals. The claw (long flower portion beside the stem) is obscurely differentiated from blade with a rounded apex. The stamens are slightly tetradynamous (having six stamens, of which four are longer than the others). The filaments (stamen stalks) are not dilated basally and slender in form. The anthers are ovate or oblong (in shape) with an obtuse apex. The nectar glands are confluent (flowing together or merging) and subtending (situated below) the bases of the stamens. The fruits (or seed capsules) are subsessile or shortly stipitate (stalked). The gynophore (stalk supporting the gynoecium) is less than 1 mm long, linear, slightly to strongly torulose (swollen and constricted at intervals), subterete to strongly latiseptate (having broad partitions). The valves (portion that fragments or splits open) are each without midvein or with obscure one on proximal 1/2. They are sparsely to densely pubescent or glabrescent (having fading surface ornamentation). The replum (framework-like placenta to which the seeds attach) is rounded and the septum (partition wall) is complete. It has 12-30 ovules (unfertilised seeds) per ovary. The style is obsolete or distinct (separate). The stigma is capitate (shaped like the head of a pin). The seeds are uniseriate (arranged in a single row or series), plump, not winged and oblong shaped. The seed coat is minutely reticulate (having a network of veining), not mucilaginous (having a viscous or gelatinous consistency) when damp. The cotyledons (young seed leaves) are incumbent (folded over).

It has a chromosome count of x = 7.

== Taxonomy ==
The genus name of Sandbergia is in honour of John Herman Sandberg (1848–1917), a Swedish-born American doctor, botanist and agronomist, who collected many plants in the Pacific northwest of America. It was first described and published in Leafl. Bot. Observ. Crit. Vol.2 on page 136 in 1911.

The genus is recognized by the United States Department of Agriculture and the Agricultural Research Service, but they do not list any known species.

== Known species ==
As accepted by Plants of the World Online;

- Sandbergia perplexa (L.F.Hend.) Al-Shehbaz (also 'puzzling rockcress', )
- Sandbergia whitedii (Piper) Greene (also 'Whited's Fissurewort', )

== Distribution and habitat ==
It is native range is western Canada (within British Columbia) and north-western U.S.A (within Idaho, Montana, Washington).

Sandbergia perplexa is found on sparsely vegetated, gravelly slopes of steppes, mountain woodlands, or pine covered woodlands in the montane zone.

While, Sandbergia whitedii is found on dry scabland (rocky land with little or no soil cover), gravelly hillsides, dry sandy slopes, alpine meadows, cliffs and on ridge crests. It grows at altitudes of 500–1,200 metres (1,600–3,900 ft) above sea level.
