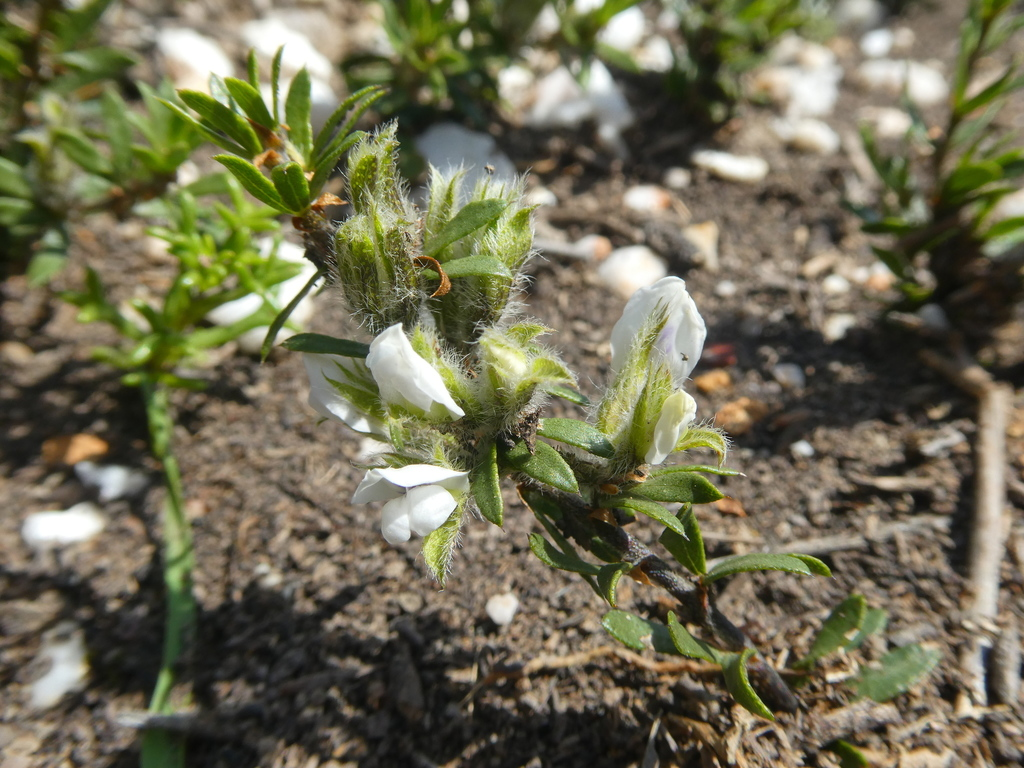

Conservation status
- Endangered (SANBI Red List)

Scientific classification
- Kingdom: Plantae
- Clade: Embryophytes
- Clade: Tracheophytes
- Clade: Angiosperms
- Clade: Eudicots
- Clade: Rosids
- Order: Fabales
- Family: Fabaceae
- Subfamily: Faboideae
- Genus: Psoralea
- Species: P. curtisiae

Binomial name
- Psoralea curtisiae (C.H.Stirt. & Muasya) C.H.Stirt.

Synonyms
- Otholobium curtisiae C.H.Stirt. & Muasya

= Psoralea curtisiae =

Species of plant endemic to South Africa

Psoralea curtisiae is a small spreading shrub assigned to the Pea family. All green parts are covered in hairs and urn-like glands. It has many woody stems, small and somewhat succulent, dark green alternately set clover-like leaves and heads consisting of 3–9 white, pea-like flowers on very short peduncles in the axils of the leaves. This species is an endemic of the Overberg area in the Western Cape province of South Africa. It mostly flowers in August and September.

== Taxonomy and naming ==
A specimen of this species was first collected for science in 2010 by Ms. Odette Curtis. Charles Stirton and A. Muthama Muasya described it in 2013 as Otholobium curtisiae, naming it in honor of Ms. Curtis. The name of the genus Otholobium is a combination of the Greek words ὠθέω (ōthéō) meaning to push and λοβός (lobos) meaning pod, which Stirton selected because its fruit seems to be pushed out of the calyx. In 2022 Stirton concluded that Otholobium was a synonym of Psoralea, and placed the species there as P. curtisiae.

== Description ==
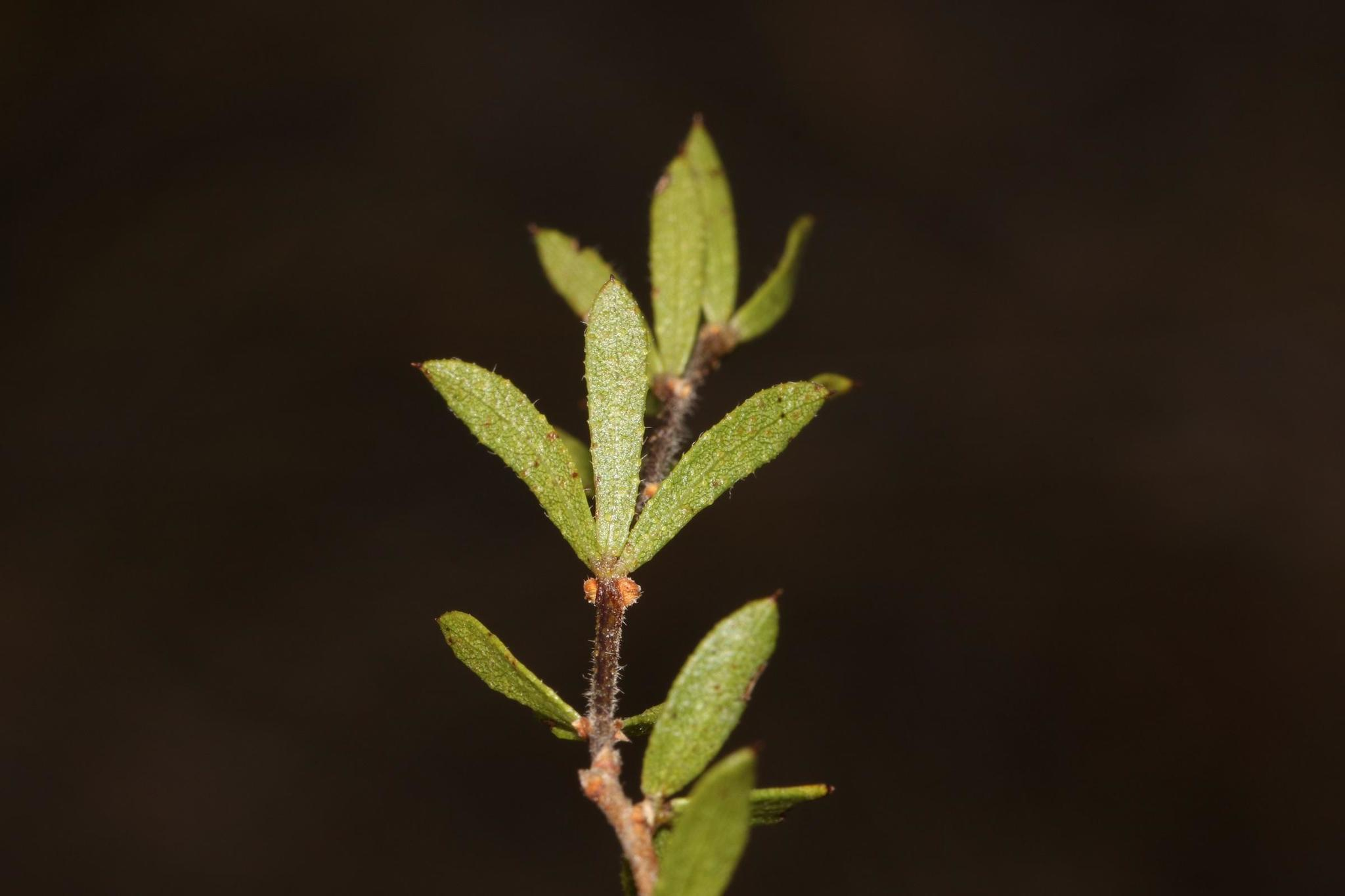
Leaves

Psoralea curtisiae is a domed to spreading shrub of about 10 cm (3.9 in) high with several 5–10 mm (0.20–0.39 in) thick, curving stems that emerge vertically from the underground rhizome and which produce side shoots near their base. These stems are covered in brown bark that splits vertically and is covered with thickened, persistent scars of discarded stipules and old urn-shaped pustules. The young shoots are purplish green in colour and covered in both short and long, stiff hairs. Flowering shoots are clustered in the upper two axils of the new season's growth, set with dense white stiff hairs, and large urn-shaped pustules concentrated below the leaves. It has alternately set leaves, that each are accompanied at the base of the petiole by 2 awl-shaped, hairless stipules of 1.5–1.7 mm (0.059–0.067 in) long and about 1.0 mm (0.039 in) wide at their base, with a fringe of hairs along the edges and many orange coloured glands, particularly at their base. These stipules are fused only at their very base with the 0.5–1.0 mm (0.020–0.039 in) long petiole. The stipules become smaller further up the shoot. At the top of the petiole are 3 flat, inverted lance-shaped to elongated and roughly rectangular, dark green leaflets of about 7–12 mm (0.28–0.47 in) long and 2.5–3.0 mm (0.098–0.118 in) wide, with one clearly visible vein along the length and dome-shaped glands on the surface. The density of the glands is higher on the underside of the leaflets. The leaflets have a wedge-shaped base, an entire margin and a pointed tip as an extension of the midvein (or mucro) that is straight in adult leaves except for the first leaves of the season that have recurved mucros. Both leaflets on the side are somewhat sickle-shaped, longer than the one in the middle, and have a hairless surface except for few stiff hairs pressed against the surface along the margins.

The flowers occur in small heads of 1 to 3 triplets in the axils of the upper few leaves on a stalk (or peduncle) of 2–3 mm (0.079–0.118 in) long. Each triplet is subtended by an oblong, softly hairy and glandular bract of 4 mm (0.16 in) long and 2 mm wide. The individual flower is 10 mm (0.39 in) long and sit on a flower stalk (or pedicel) of 2–3 mm (0.079–0.118 in) long, and is subtended by a densely hairy, narrow bract of 1 mm (0.039 in) long. The zygomorph calyx is 9 mm (0.35 in) long. The 5 sepals are merged at their base into a tube of about 2 mm (0.079 in) long, but form teeth towards the tip that are covered in small and large glands and are densely set with white hair on the outside. The upper four teeth are similar in shape and 5 mm (0.20 in) long and 2 mm (0.079 in) wide, the tooth adjoining the keel is 7 mm (0.28 in) long and 3 mm (0.12 in). As in most Faboideae, the corolla is zygomorph, forms a specialized structure and consists of 5 free white petals. The upper petal, called the banner or standard, measures about 10 mm (0.39 in) high and 6.0 mm (0.24 in) wide and consist of a claw of 0.5 mm (0.020 in) long at its base, and an elliptic blade. The blade is adorned by a purple area at the base of about 4 mm (0.16 in) high and 2 mm (0.079 in) wide, that functions as a nectar guide. On each side, an ear-shaped appendage reaches somewhat beyond the attachment to the claw, and the tip of the blade is pointy. The 2 lateral petals called wings are about 9 mm (0.35 in) long and 2.5–2.6 mm (0.098–0.102 in) wide, longer than the keel, each having a narrow claw at their base of 3 mm (0.12 in) long, and a wider blade with an ear-like extension blade, knife-like but with the tips bulging outwards and curving inwards. The blade is sculptured with 30–55 irregularly parallel lamellae. The 2 lower petals, jointly called the keel, consists of 3 mm (0.12 in) long claws at base and blades of 7 mm (0.28 in) long and 4 mm (0.16 in) wide. The keel envelops a tube of the 10 filaments, the 9 which are merged over almost the entire length are 7 mm (0.28 in) long and 1 that is attached at its base only is 6.0–6.5 mm (0.24–0.26 in) long. The tube formed by the filaments in turn encloses the 7 mm (0.28 in) long pistil. Its base is a so-called gynophore of 0.5 mm (0.020 in) long, followed by an ovary of 2.5 mm (0.098 in) with a papillose surface, next a glabrous style of 0.5 mm (0.020 in) thick at the point where it curves upwards for about 1.5 mm (0.059 in) and somewhat backwards. The ovary develops into a 1-seeded, hairless, papery thin fruit of 4 mm (0.16 in) long and 2 mm (0.079 in) with many glands.

=== Differences with related species ===
Psoralea curtisiae differs from P. picta by its many spreading stems, the middle leaflet being shorter than the side leaflets, the straight extended vein (or mucro) at the tip of each leaflet, the obviously stalked inflorescences consisting of 6–9 flowers, the oblong bracts that subtend each triplet of flowers and the warty fruits. P. picta on the other hand, is a shrub with leaflets of equal length, tipped by a recurved mucro, with dense spikes consisting of 20–30 triplets of flowers, each of which is subtended by a broadly ovate bract, producing pods without warts.

== Ecology ==
Psoralea curtisiae grows back from its underground rootstock after the above ground biomass is destroyed in one of the fires that occur in the fynbos every decade of two. On all six locations where O. curtisiae was known to be growing at the time of its naming, it was accompanied by Delospermum asperulum, Drosanthemum parviflorum (both Aizoaceae), Relhania garnotii (Asteraceae), Ficinia gordongrayae (Cyperaceae) and Pentaschistis eriostoma (Poaceae).

== Distribution and conservation ==
Psoralea curtisiae occurs on quartzite outcrops surrounded by shale renosterveld at an elevation of 250–300 m (820–980 ft) in a line roughly halfway between Bredasdorp in the southwest, and Swellendam and Heidelberg the northeast, within the Western Cape province of South Africa. It is considered endangered because it is known from only six locations, none of which lies within a protected area. In the past locations may have been lost due to crop cultivation, nowadays a continuing decline is caused by overgrazing and too frequent firing. There are probably less than 300 mature plants left.
