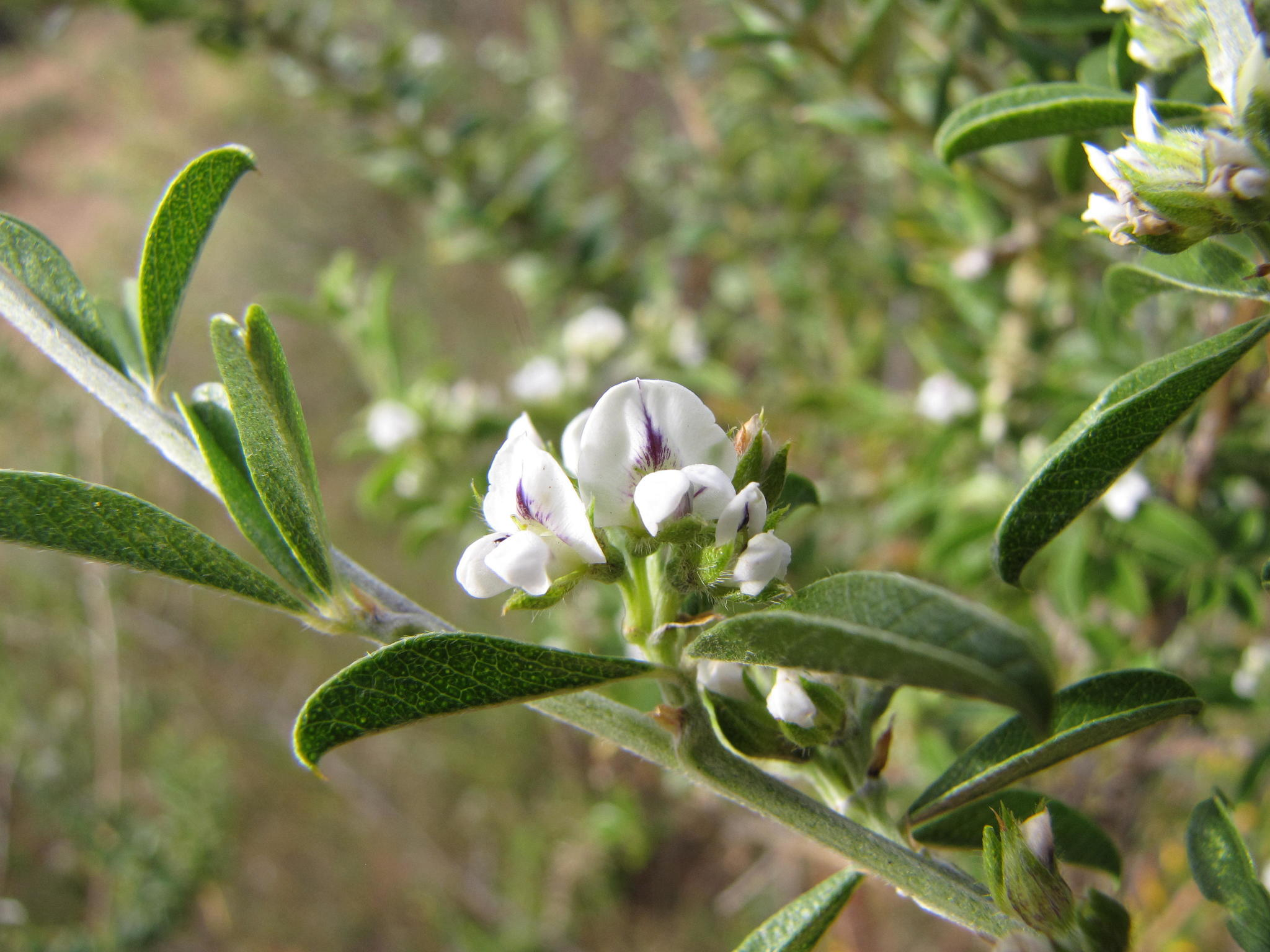

Conservation status
- Vulnerable (SANBI Red List)

Scientific classification
- Kingdom: Plantae
- Clade: Embryophytes
- Clade: Tracheophytes
- Clade: Angiosperms
- Clade: Eudicots
- Clade: Rosids
- Order: Fabales
- Family: Fabaceae
- Subfamily: Faboideae
- Genus: Psoralea
- Species: P. spissa

Binomial name
- Psoralea spissa (C.H.Stirt. & Muasya) C.H.Stirt.

Synonyms
- Otholobium spissum C.H.Stirt. & Muasya

= Psoralea spissa =

Species of plant endemic to South Africa

Psoralea spissa is a dense, tangled, much branched shrub of up to 185 cm (73 in) high that is assigned to the Pea family. It has dull green, clover-like leaves and white, pea-like flowers with a streaky, triangular, purple nectar guide. The species grows in renosterveld in the central mountains of the Western Cape province of South Africa. This species flowers in July and August.

== Description ==
Psoralea spissa is a dense, tangled, much branched shrub of up to 185 cm (73 in) high. Its greyish-brown branches are set with many white lenticels and are initially covered with white appressed soft hair. Next to the base of each leaf are two persistent, straight, awl-shaped stipules of 20–25 mm (0.79–0.98 in) long, which is longer than the softly hairy leafstalk or petiole of 1–1.5 mm (0.039–0.059 in) long. Each leaf further consists of three distinctly glandular, hairless, dull green, inverted egg-shaped leaflets of 7–11 mm (0.28–0.43 in) long and 4–6 mm (0.16–0.24 in) wide, with a wedge-shaped base, a smooth margin and slightly indented at the tip, but with the main vein extending beyond the leaf blade into a sharply hooked point.

The flowers occur in groups of three in the axil of the highest leaves of short new side shoots and each triplet is subtended by a small oblong bract that is quickly shed. The flowers sit on a pedicel of about 2 mm (0.079 in) long, are themselves 5–6 mm (0.20–0.24 in) long and are individually subtended by a minute tuft of hairs. The calyx has a purplish wash, is adorned with glands, more densely on the teeth and carries few short, black hairs, pressed to its surface. The calyx is merged in a widening tube of about 2.5 mm (0.098 in) long but ends in five lance-shaped teeth that are curved like a sickle blade, 5–6 mm (0.20–0.24 in) long and 0.5–2 mm (0.020–0.079 in) wide. The tooth on the underside of the flower, next to the keel is somewhat wider than the other teeth, the two teeth on the upper side of the flower, next to the standard are not fused beyond the rim of the tube. As in most Faboideae, the corolla is zygomorphic, forms a specialized structure and consists of five free petals. The upper petal, called the banner or standard is very broadly inverted egg-shaped, 6–7 mm (0.24–0.28 in) long and about 6.5 mm (0.26 in) wide, white with a broadly triangular streaky purple nectar guide extending from the claw in greenish yellow. The wider part at the top called the blade is slightly indented at the tip and extends to two very shallow lobes (or auricles) facing the base, and extending down between the lobes into a narrow part called claw of about 2 mm (0.079 in) long. The two side petals called wings have blades of about 6–6.5 mm (0.24–0.26 in) long and about 2 mm (0.079 in) wide, which is twice as long as the keel blades that they enclose, and the claws at their base are about 2 mm (0.079 in) long, with a bulge along midline. The wings are longer than and enclose the two bottom petals, which are together called the keel. The two keel petals form a boat-like structure. The keel envelops the ten filaments of about 5 mm (0.20 in) long, which are fused together in their lower half into a tube. This androecium partly hides the pistil of 4–4.5 mm (0.16–0.18 in) long, including at its base the ovary of 1.5 mm (0.059 in) long, that is set with dense silky hairs. About 1.5 mm under the tip, the pistil is widened and curves upwards, and at its very tip is a stigma with brush-like hairs.

=== Differences with related species ===
Psoralea spissa differs from P. candicans, which is an open spreading or upright shrub with willowy seasonal shoots (not a densely branched, compact shrub), that sheds last season's short shoots (not retaining them), has narrow leaves with very fine soft hair or hairless with hardly visible glands (not broader hairless leaves with clearly visible glands), flowers without bracts, a white silky hairy or hairless calyx, lilac petals (not small tufts of hairs subtending the small stumpy flowers, a sparsely black-haired calyx and white petals) and chestnut brown seeds (not khaki with brown blotches).

== Taxonomy ==
As far as known, a specimen of this species was first collected by the famous South African botanist Harry Bolus in 1907. Charles Stirton and A. Muthama Muasya considered it sufficiently different from its relatives, described it in 2017, and called it Otholobium spissum. The name of the genus Otholobium is a combination of the Greek words ὠθέω (ōthéō) meaning to push and λοβός (lobos) meaning pod, which Stirton selected because its fruit seems to be pushed out of the calyx. The species name spissum is derived from the Ancient Greek word σπιδνός (spidnós) meaning dense or solid. In 2022 Stirton concluded that Otholobium is a synonym of Psoralea and renamed the species P. spissa.

== Conservation, distribution and ecology ==
Psoralea spissa is considered a vulnerable species that is known from seven locations. These populations are declining due to expanding vineyards and olive cultivation. It occurs in the Central mountain renosterveld on Bokkeveld and Witteberg shales at an elevation of about 600 m (2,000 ft), in the Western Cape province of South Africa. It mostly grows individually but sometimes occurs in larger groups. This species dies in a fire and is therefore expected to produce many seeds.
