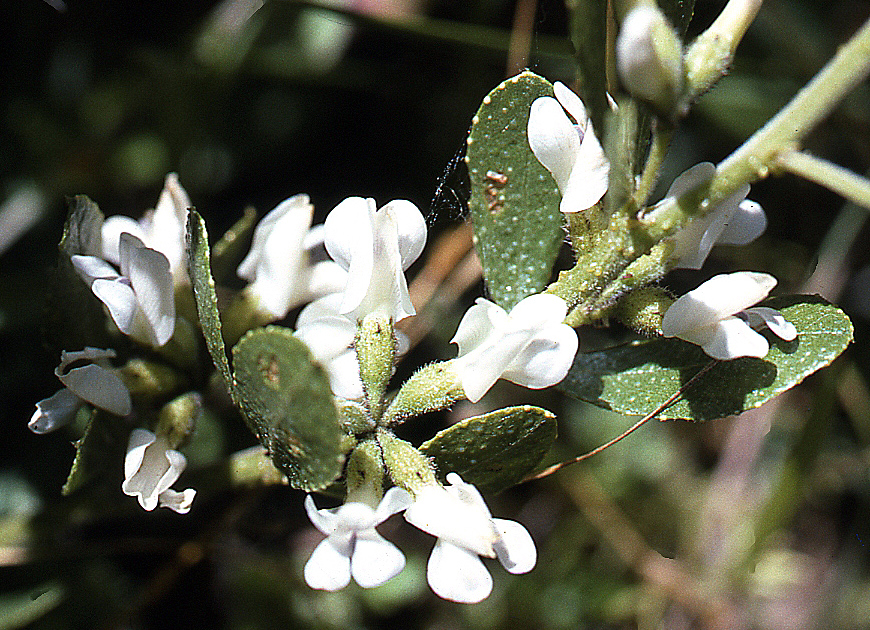

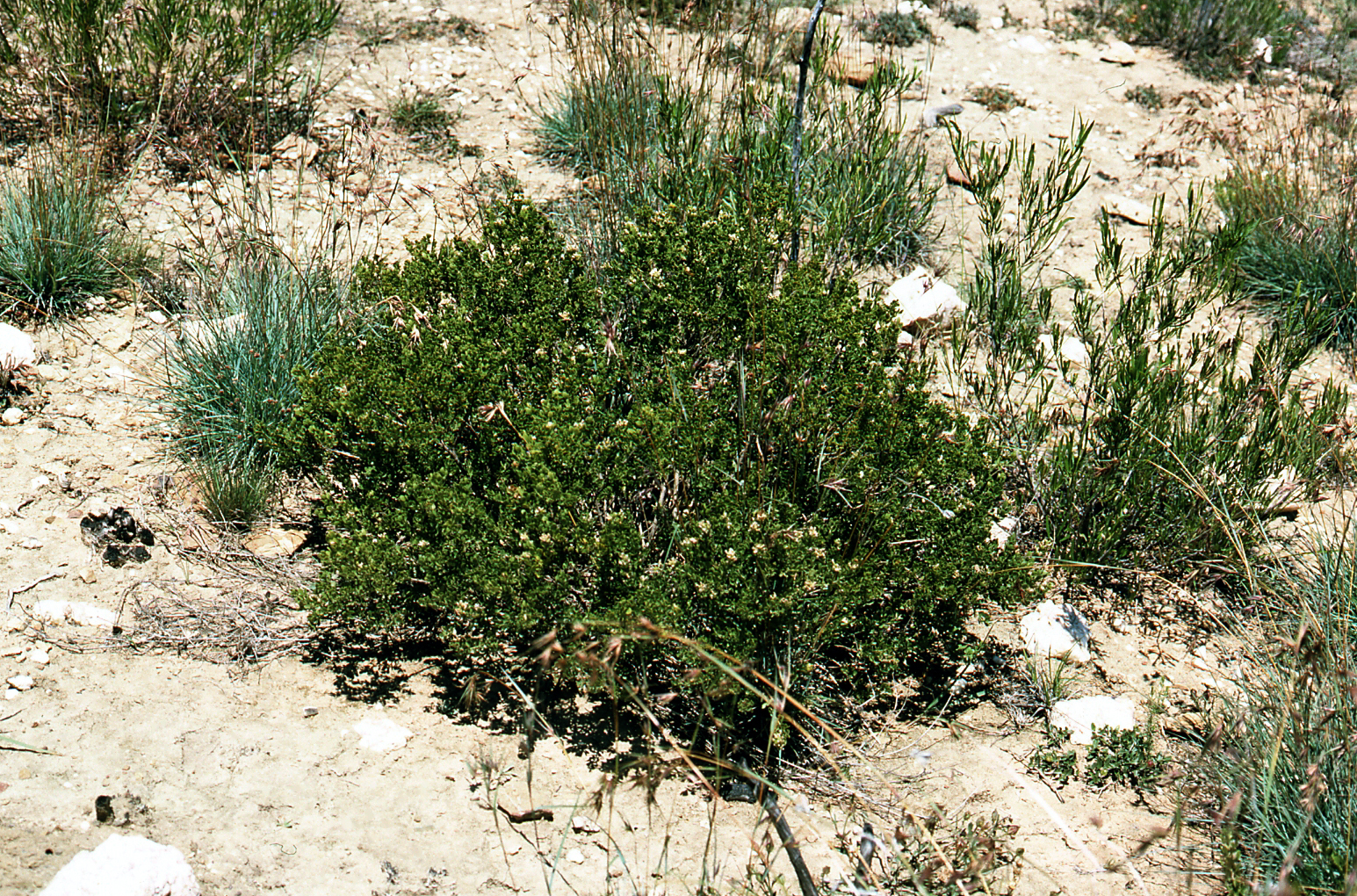

Conservation status
- Vulnerable (SANBI Red List)

Scientific classification
- Kingdom: Plantae
- Clade: Embryophytes
- Clade: Tracheophytes
- Clade: Angiosperms
- Clade: Eudicots
- Clade: Rosids
- Order: Fabales
- Family: Fabaceae
- Subfamily: Faboideae
- Genus: Psoralea
- Species: P. lucens

Binomial name
- Psoralea lucens (C.H.Stirt. & Muasya) C.H.Stirt.

Synonyms
- Otholobium lucens C.H.Stirt. & Muasya

= Psoralea lucens =

Species of plant endemic to South Africa

Psoralea lucens is a shrub of up to 60 cm (24 in) high that is assigned to the pea family. It has alternately set clover-like leaves crowding on the new growth, while older parts have lost their leaves. The white, pea-like flowers occur with 3 or 6 together in the leaf axils. This rare species is an endemic of the Swartberg mountains in the Western Cape province of South Africa. It flowers between July and February.

== Taxonomy ==
A specimen of this shrub were first collected in 1907. In 2017, Charles Stirton and A. Muthama Muasya considered it sufficiently different from other Otholobium species, in particular O. polystictum, to distinguish and name it O. lucens. No synonyms are known. The name of the genus Otholobium is a combination of the Greek words ὠθέω (ōthéō) meaning to push and λοβός (lobos) meaning pod, which Stirton selected because its fruit seems to be pushed out of the calyx. The species epithet lūcēns is a Latin word meaning "shining". In 2022 Stirton determined that Otholobium is a synonym of Psoralea and renamed the species P. lucens.

== Description ==
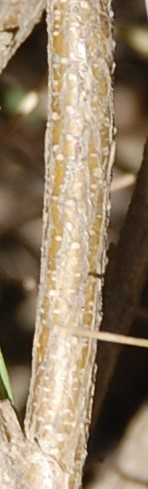
Stem with typical cracked, yellowish-brown to black, scurfy bark

Psoralea lucens is a rounded shrub of up to 60 cm (24 in) high that is assigned to the Pea family. It regrows from an underground rootstock after a fire destroyed the vegetation and initially produces lush, large, soft, bright green leaves. For about 10 following years the plants every year produce smaller, leathery leaves that occur on short seasonal shoots. From the rootstock emerge many stems that branch near their base, and have a cracked, yellowish-brown to black, scurfy bark. Leaves are only present on the new seasonal shoots, older leaves are discarded. The shoots are softly hairy and carry shiny, conspicuously raised glands. Its leaves are accompanied at their base by a pair of awl-shaped stipules of 2–3 mm (0.079–0.118 in) long that are pressed against the stem. The leaf stalk or petiole is about 2–3 mm long, the 3 leaflet stalks (or petiolules) are about 1 mm (0.039 in) long. The leaflets are hairless, inverted egg-shaped, with a wedge-shaped base and a blunt tip, but the midvein extends beyond the leaf blade into a hooked point, while both surfaces are adorned with crater-shaped glands of different sizes in equal density, which become shiny orange when dried. These glands are raised at the lower surface. The central leaflet is 13–16 mm (0.51–0.63 in) long and 4–6.5 mm (0.16–0.26 in) wide. When the plants reoccur after a fire they look quite different with much larger and saft, large and bright green leaves, instead of small, leathery leaves.

The flowers occur in 1 or 2 groups of three in the axils of the leaves of the new growth. Each triplet is subtended by a fan-shaped bract of 1–1.5 mm (0.039–0.059 in) long with several teeth. The triplets sit on a pedicel of about 3–5 mm (0.12–0.20 in) long. The calyx is about half as long as the corolla, is prominently ribbed and adorned with glands and soft black hair over its entire surface. The calyx is merged in an urn-shaped tube of about 3.5 mm (0.14 in) long but ends in five equal, triangular, sharply pointed teeth of 4–5 mm (0.16–0.20 in) long and 0.5–2 mm (0.020–0.079 in) wide. As in most Faboideae, the corolla is zygomorphic, forms a specialized structure and consists of five free petals. The upper petal, called the banner or standard is elliptic, 9–10 mm (0.35–0.39 in) long and about 7–8 mm (0.28–0.31 in) wide, white with a green nectar guide at the very base extending from the claw of only about 1 mm (0.039 in) long. The wider part at the top called the blade is slightly indented at the tip and extends to two hardly discernible lobes (or auricles) facing the base, and extending down between the lobes into a narrow part called claw of about 1 mm long. The two side petals called wings each consist of a blade of about 8.5–10 mm (0.33–0.39 in) long and 2.5–3 mm (0.098–0.118 in) wide in the upper part, have an auricle facing the base and the claws at their base are about 2.5–3 mm long. The wing blade is adorned with 25-50 interlocking ridges, midlength above the main vein. The wings are longer than and enclose the two bottom petals, which are together called the keel. The two keel petals form a boat-like structure, with a blade of 7–8 mm (0.28–0.31 in) long and 2–3 mm (0.079–0.118 in) wide and a claw of 3–3.5 mm (0.12–0.14 in) long. the keel blade is adorned with 30–35 ridges in the upper tip portion. The keel envelops the ten filaments of about 7 mm (0.28 in) long, 9 of which are fused for most of their length. The filament that is almost free is undulating. This androecium partly hides the pistil of about 7 mm (0.28 in) long, including at its base a stalk of about 1 mm, followed by the ovary of 2.5 mm (0.098 in) long, that is set with dense rough hairs. Under the tip, the pistil is widened to 1.5–1.8 mm (0.059–0.071 in) and curves upwards, and at its very tip is a pinhead-shaped stigma. Fruits and seeds have not been described sofar.

=== Differences with related species ===
Psoralea lucens has similarities with O. polystictum, which is a laxly branched, willowy shrub up to 2.5 m (8 ft 2 in) (not a rounded, densely branched subshrub of up to 60 cm), with asymmetrical lateral leaflets (not symmetrical), lance-shaped stipules (not awl-shaped), more and larger glands on upper leaf surface, that become black when dried (not similarly sized and distributed glands on both surfaces, drying orange), oblong bracts subtending the flower triplets (not a fan-shaped bract with several teeth), calyx lobes of about 65% of length of flower (not only half as long as the flower), and a mauve corolla with a reddish purple and white central nectar guide (not white flowers without a nectar guide).

== Conservation, distribution and ecology ==
Psoralea lucens is a vulnerable species, because only three locations are currently known within a distribution area of less than 50 km^{2} (19 sq mi). These locations are potentially threatened by infrastructure expansion and crop cultivation. Here, the species grows in Kango Limestone Renosterveld, typically in the transition zone between sandstone and shale derived soils in the foothills of the Groot Swartberg Mountains. It occurs at 600–750 m (1,970–2,460 ft) elevation. The plants usually flower between July and November, but fires will trigger flowering as late as February.
