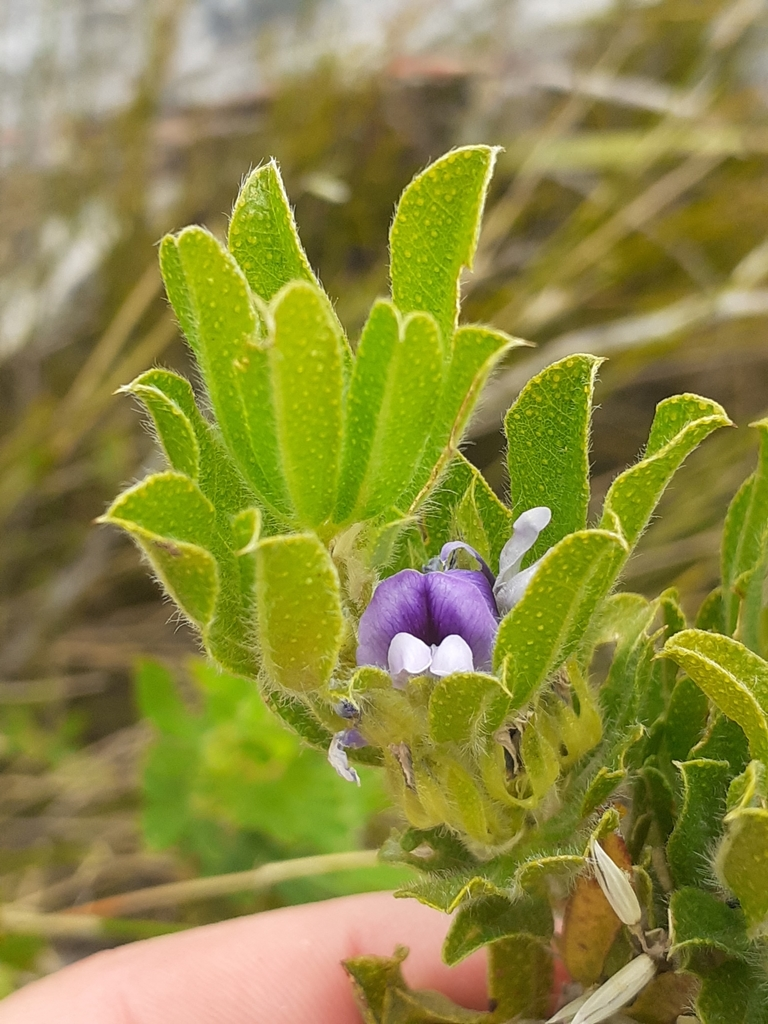
- Southern form (top) and typical form (bottom)
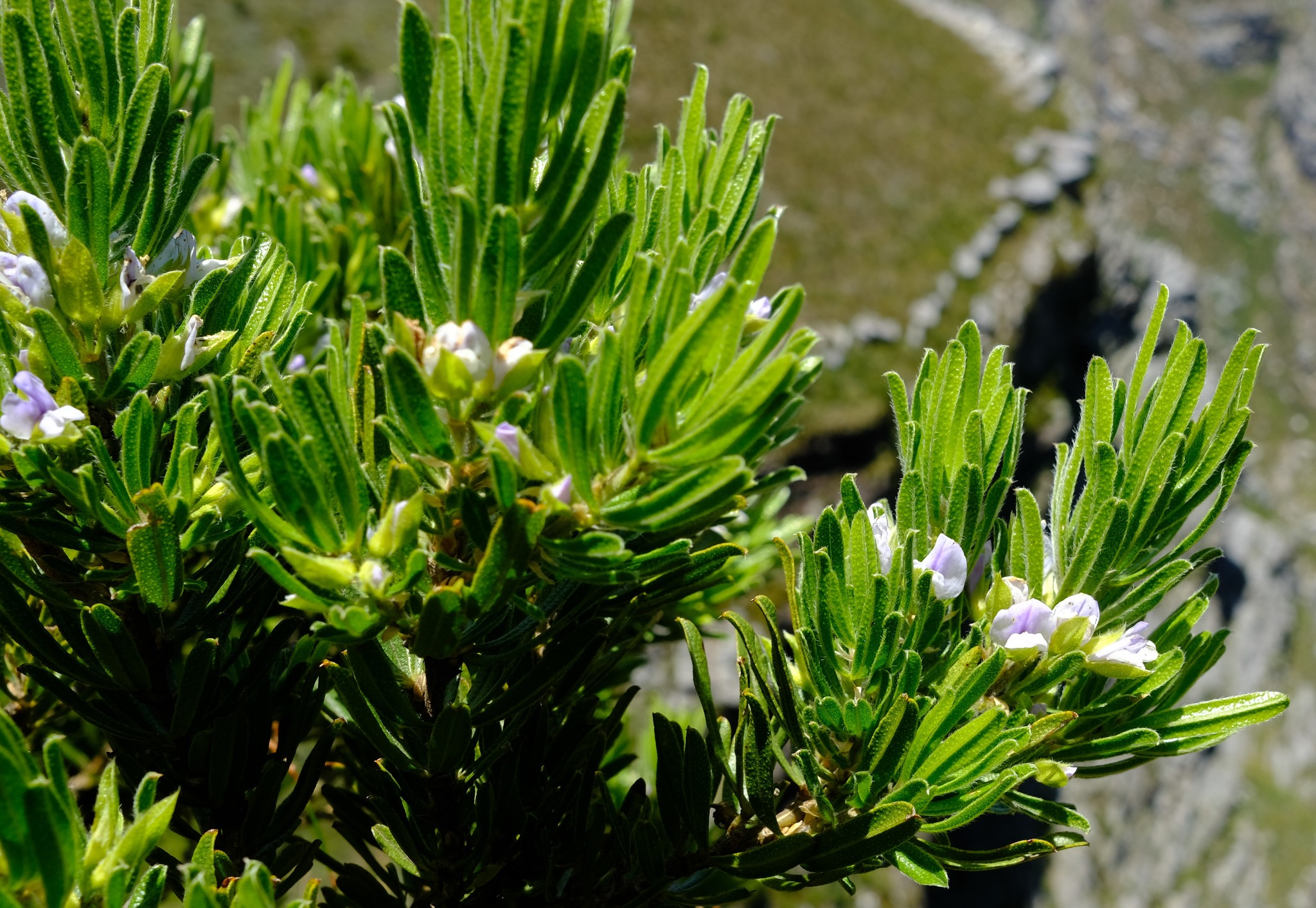

Scientific classification
- Kingdom: Plantae
- Clade: Embryophytes
- Clade: Tracheophytes
- Clade: Angiosperms
- Clade: Eudicots
- Clade: Rosids
- Order: Fabales
- Family: Fabaceae
- Subfamily: Faboideae
- Genus: Psoralea
- Species: P. nitens

Binomial name
- Psoralea nitens (C.H.Stirt. & Muasya) C.H.Stirt.

Synonyms
- Otholobium nitens C.H.Stirt. & Muasya

= Psoralea nitens =

Species of plant endemic to South Africa

Psoralea nitens is an upright, densely branched shrub of up to 1.5 m (4 ft 11 in) high that is assigned to the Pea family. It has one to many initially softly hairy stems, alternately set, clover-like, upright leaves crowding the new shoots, and heads consisting of 3 pea-like, dark purple to mauve flowers on short peduncles in the axils of the leaves on short side-shoots. This species is an endemic of the mountains between Ceres and Hottentots Holland in the Western Cape province of South Africa. It mostly flowers between October and late December.

== Taxonomy ==
Specimens of the species have been collected for science since 1950. In 2017, Charles Stirton and A. Muthama Muasya considered it sufficiently different from its relatives, in particular O. mundianum, described it, and called it Otholobium nitens. The name of the genus Otholobium is compounded from the Greek words ὠθέω (ōthéō) meaning to push and λοβός (lobos) meaning pod, which Stirton selected because its fruit seems to be pushed out of the calyx. The specific epithet (nitens) is a Latin word meaning "shining", referring to the shiny felty hairs that adorn the young stems of this species. In 2022 Stirton determined that Otholobium was a synonym of Psoralea and renamed the species P. nitens.

== Description ==
Psoralea nitens is an upright, profusely branching, somewhat cylindrical shrub of up to 1.5 m (4 ft 11 in) high. From the ground emerge one to many shiny silky, softly hairy stems with the nodes close to each other. The alternate leaves are set at an upward angle, have at their base two asymmetrical, oval lance-shaped to triangular, softly hairy, papery stipules with dot-like glands and a striped appearance due to parallel veins, that clasp the stem and are 3–5 mm (0.12–0.20 in) long and about 3 mm wide. The petiole is 3.5–4 mm (0.14–0.16 in) long, and remains after the leaflets have been shed. The 3 leaflets each sit at the tip of a petiolule of about 1 mm (0.039 in) long. The two lateral leaflets are asymmetrical, slightly sickle-shaped, about two thirds of the length of the middle leaflet at 2–3 cm (0.79–1.18 in), exceptionally up to 3.5 cm (1.4 in) long and 3–3.5 mm (0.12–0.14 in), exceptially up to 11 mm (0.43 in) wide. The leaflets are narrowly inverted egg-shaped to inverted egg-shaped, have a wedge-shaped base, a margin with very fine rounded teeth, the midrib extending beyond the leaflet blade into a hooked point. Plants in the Hottentots Holland Mountains have relatively wide leaflets. The leaf surface is shiny, and has many, both sunken and raised, somewhat translucent glands that turn reddish brown or blackish when dry. Young leaflets are hairless except for prominent adpressed silky hairs along the midrib and margins.

The inflorescences consist of 3 flowers on an inflorescence stalk of 5–7 mm (0.20–0.28 in) long that emerges from the axils of the leaves on the short shoots. Subtending each flower cluster is an oval bract with dot-like glands and black hairs that is about 5 mm (0.20 in) long and 4 mm (0.16 in) wide. Individual flowers are 11–13 mm (0.43–0.51 in) long. The calyx is hairless except for black hairs pressed along the veins and margins. The calyx is merged at it base into a funnel-shaped tube of about 4 mm (0.16 in) long that extends into unequal lobes of 6–8 mm (0.24–0.31 in) long. The tooth subtending the keel is 6–7 mm (0.24–0.28 in) wide, which is 3–4 times wider than the other teeth. As in most Faboideae, the corolla is zygomorphic, forms a specialized structure and consists of 5 free petals. The upper petal, called the banner or standard is inverted egg-shaped or elliptic, 12–13 mm (0.47–0.51 in) long and 7–8 mm (0.28–0.31 in) wide, mauve with purple veins and a large purple nectar guide extending from the claw. The wider part at the top called the blade is slightly indented at the tip and extends to 2 very shallow lobes (or auricles) facing the base, and extending down between the lobes into a narrow part called claw of about 2 mm (0.079 in) long. The two side petals called wings have blades of about 13 mm (0.51 in) long and 3 mm (0.12 in) wide, which is twice longer than the keel blades that they enclose, and the claws at their base are about 3 mm (0.12 in) long. The wing blades are adorned with up to 20 ridges and swollen tips. The 2 keel petals stick together along their base and are 6.5–7 mm (0.26–0.28 in) long and about 2 mm (0.079 in) wide, with a 2–2.5 mm (0.079–0.098 in) long claw at its base and a slightly beaked tip. The keel envelops a hollow, open tube of 6.5–7 mm (0.26–0.28 in) long, made up of 9 merged filaments and 1 stamen that is only fused in the lower third, all topped by equally long anthers of 1–2 mm (0.039–0.079 in) long. Largely hidden in this androecium is a 6–7 mm (0.24–0.28 in) long pistil, including at its base the ovary of about 1.5 mm (0.059 in) long that is adorned with sparse glands. At the tip the ovary extends into a forward sloping style that is thickened at the place where it curves upwards about 1.5 mm from its end. The pistil it topped by a small stigma with brush-like hairs. This gynoecium develop into a hairless pod of about 5 mm (0.20 in) long and 3 mm (0.12 in) wide, with a papery skin supported by netted veining. The only seed in each pod is chestnut brown in colour and 4–5 mm (0.16–0.20 in) long, 2–3 mm (0.079–0.118 in) wide with the attachment scar (or hilum) mid-length.

=== Differences with related species ===
Psoralea nitens differs from P. mundiana by the characteristically numerous and variously-sized leaf glands, drying black (not sparse, more or less evenly sized glands that dry reddish orange), narrower, 3–3.5 (–11) mm wide leaflets (not 7–11 mm wide), mauve or bluish purple standard with deep purple nectar guide (not white standard with green nectar guide), the lowest tooth of the calyx with black hairs and 3 times wider than the other teeth (not white-haired and twice as wide other), and the wing petals twice as long as the keel petals (not wing petals only one third longer than keel petals).

== Conservation, distribution and ecology ==
Psoralea nitens is a rare species. It is restricted to the high mountains in the south Western Cape between the Kogelberg area and Ceres, where it does not face any threats. This species resprouts from an underground rootstock after a fire destroyed the above ground biomass. It produces only a few seeds.
