= Psoralea vanberkeliae =

Scientific classification
- Kingdom: Plantae
- Clade: Tracheophytes
- Clade: Angiosperms
- Clade: Eudicots
- Clade: Rosids
- Order: Fabales
- Family: Fabaceae
- Subfamily: Faboideae
- Genus: Psoralea
- Species: P. vanberkeliae

Binomial name
- Psoralea vanberkeliae C.H.Stirt., A.Bello & Muasya

Species of legume

Psoralea vanberkeliae is a species of legume in the family Fabaceae. It is found in the Western Cape of South Africa. The epithet is also spelt vanberkelae.
