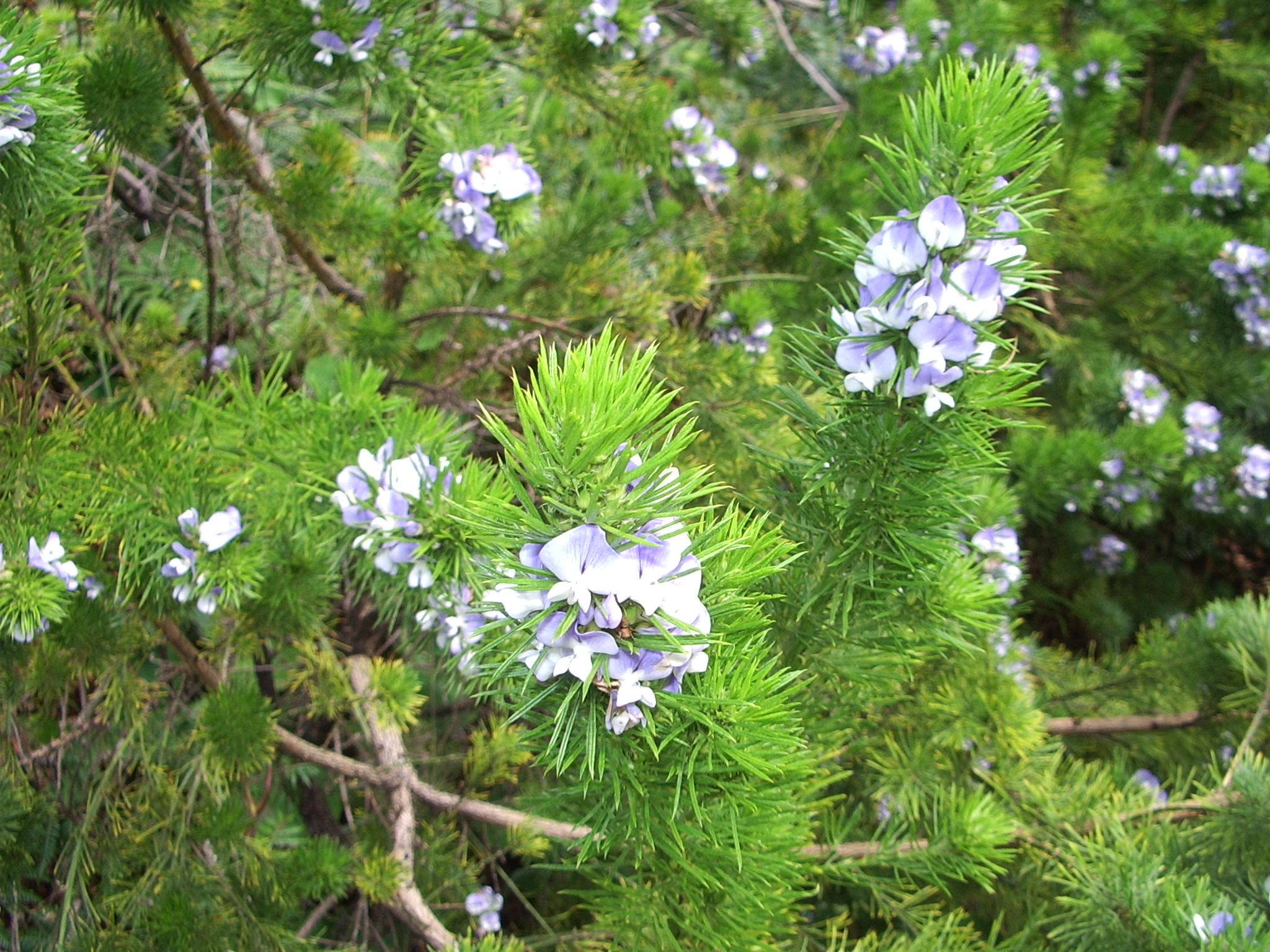

Scientific classification
- Kingdom: Plantae
- Clade: Tracheophytes
- Clade: Angiosperms
- Clade: Eudicots
- Clade: Rosids
- Order: Fabales
- Family: Fabaceae
- Subfamily: Faboideae
- Genus: Psoralea
- Species: P. pinnata

Binomial name
- Psoralea pinnata L.

Synonyms
- Lotodes pinnatum (L.) Kuntze; Psoralea altissima Bertol.; Psoralea conferta Bertol.; Psoralea decidua Sieber; Psoralea decidua Sieber ex Walp.; Psoralea kraussiana Meisn.; Psoralea krebsii Vogel; Psoralea krebsii Vogel ex Walp.; Psoralea tenuifolia Eckl. & Zeyh.; Ruteria africana Medik.; Ruteria pinnata (L.) Medik.

= Psoralea pinnata =

Species of legume

Psoralea pinnata is an erect evergreen shrub or small tree that grows to a height between 1.5 metres (5 ft) and 4 metres (13 ft) tall.

== Description ==
This plant has fine deep green linear leaves that are deeply divided with a length of about 40 millimetres (2 in). The linear leaf blades occur in crowded alternate spirals are 0.8 millimetres (0 in) to 2 millimetres (0 in) in width and taper from the base. This plant blooms with white, lilac or blue pea shaped sweet smelling flowers between October and December. in large clusters toward the end of the branches. Flowering is followed by the production of small pods, each of these contain a single dark brown seed.

== Distribution ==
Psoralea pinnata is a native of South Africa; it is also an established alien species in other countries, particularly Southern Australia and New Zealand.

== Common names ==
Psoralea pinnata has many common names. In South Africa the plant is commonly known as the fountain bush or fonteinbos, it also is called penwortel, bloukeur and is known as umhlonishwa by the Zulu. In Australia, where P. pinnata is a weed, it is known as taylorina and in Western Australia it is also known as the blue broom or the Albany broom. In other parts of the world it is also called the African scurf pea, taylorina, blue psoralea and the Dally pine.
