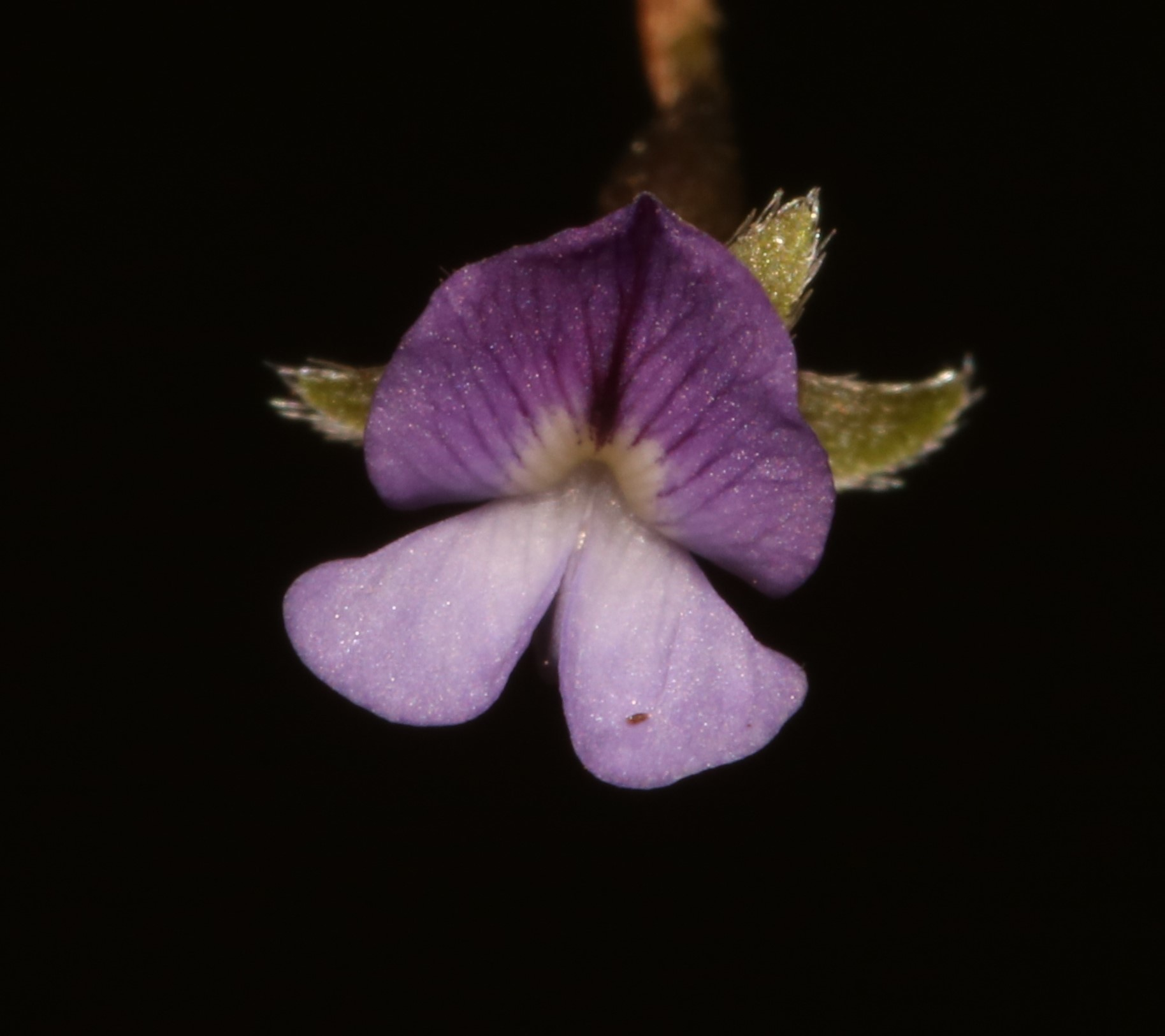

Conservation status
- Critically endangered (SANBI Red List)

Scientific classification
- Kingdom: Plantae
- Clade: Tracheophytes
- Clade: Angiosperms
- Clade: Eudicots
- Clade: Rosids
- Order: Fabales
- Family: Fabaceae
- Subfamily: Faboideae
- Genus: Psoralea
- Species: P. cataracta

Binomial name
- Psoralea cataracta C.H.Stirt.

Synonyms
- Hallia filiformis Harv.

= Psoralea cataracta =

Species of plant endemic to the Western Cape

Psoralea cataracta is a species of flowering plant in the family Fabaceae. It was declared extinct in 2008 in the Red List of South African Plants, with a single specimen collected from the Tulbagh Waterfall in 1804. It was rediscovered 200 years later by Brian Du Preez in November of 2019 in the Winterhoek Mountains near Tulbagh. It is endemic to the Western Cape. It is also known by the name waterfall fountainbush.

== Description ==
Psoralea cataracta has small purple flowers dangling on long, thread-like flower stalks.

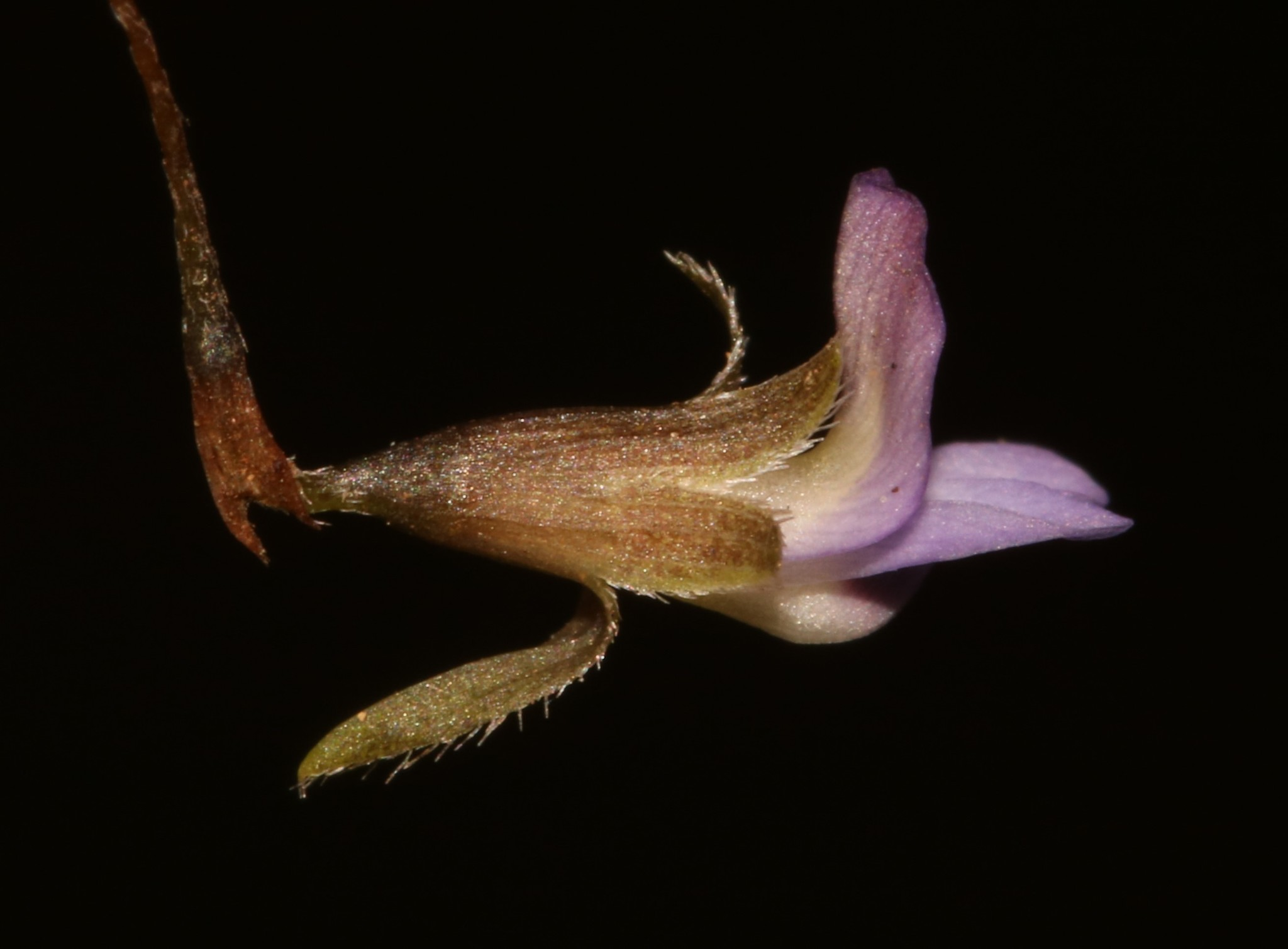

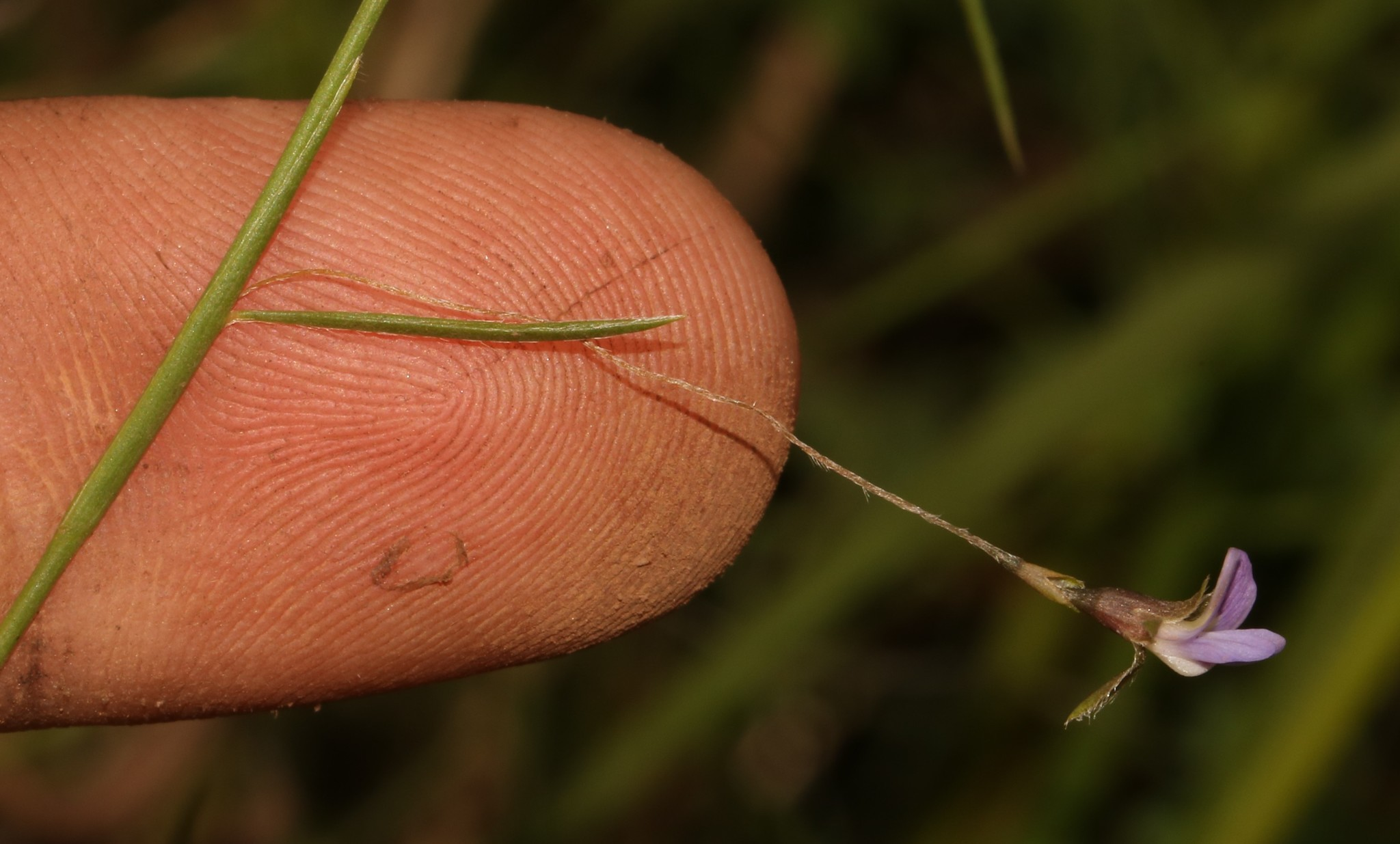

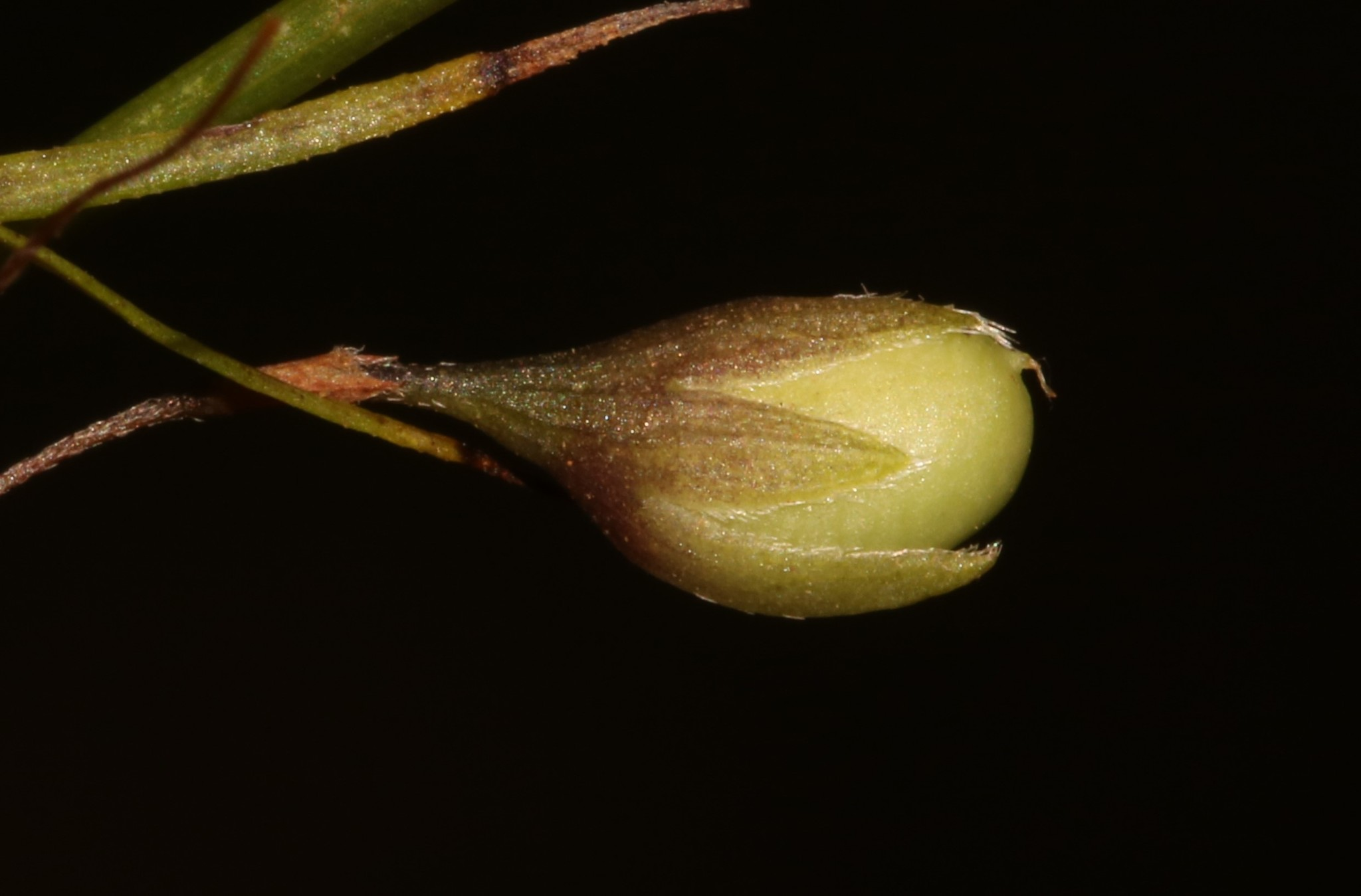

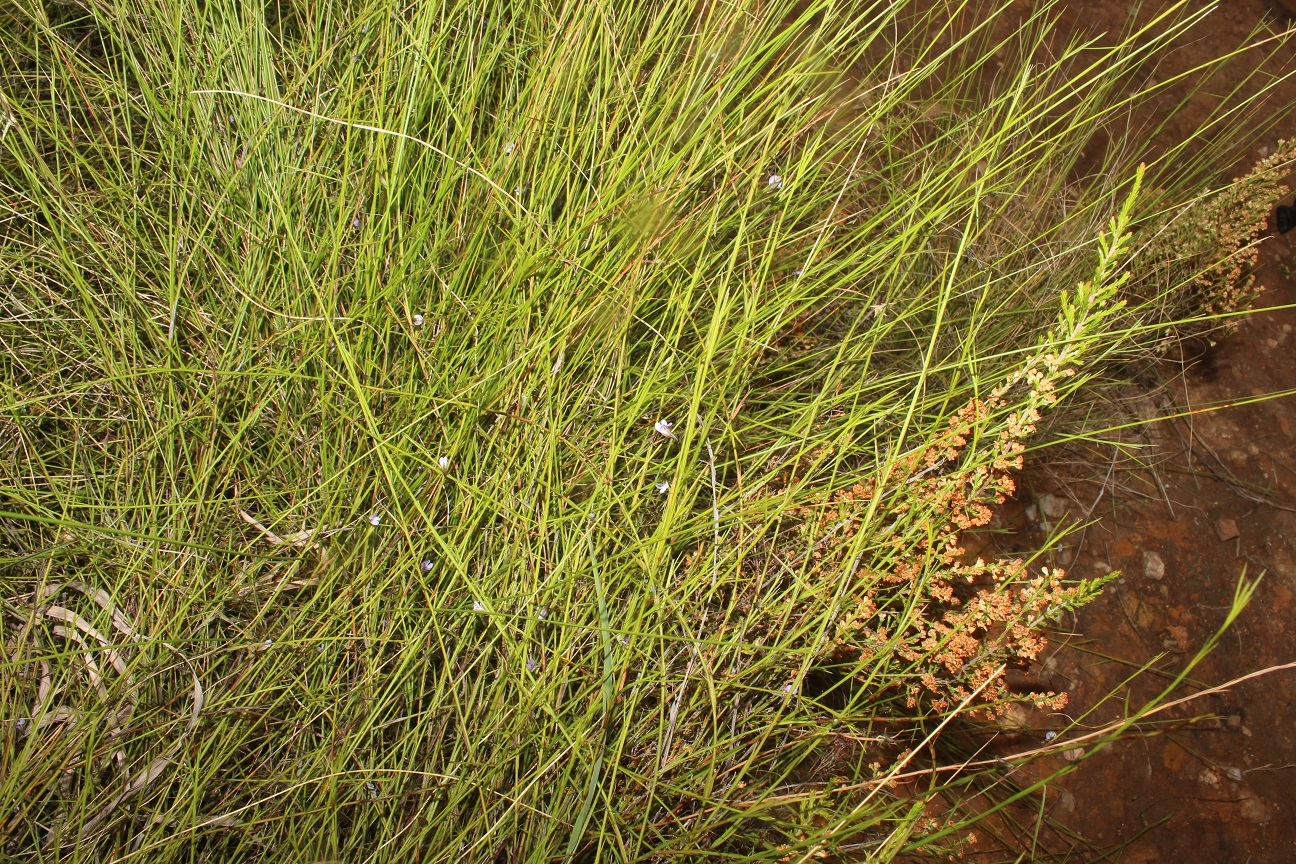

== Distribution ==
Psoralea cataracta is found around the southern slopes of the Winterhoek Mountains in the Tulbagh Valley.

== Conservation status ==
As of the 2022 classification, Psoralea cataracta is classified as Critically Endangered due to its restricted extent of occurrence and area of occupancy of less than 8 km^{2}, the threat of alien invasive species such as Acacia mearnsii and species of Pinus, and the expansion of farmland in the Winterhoek Mountains.
