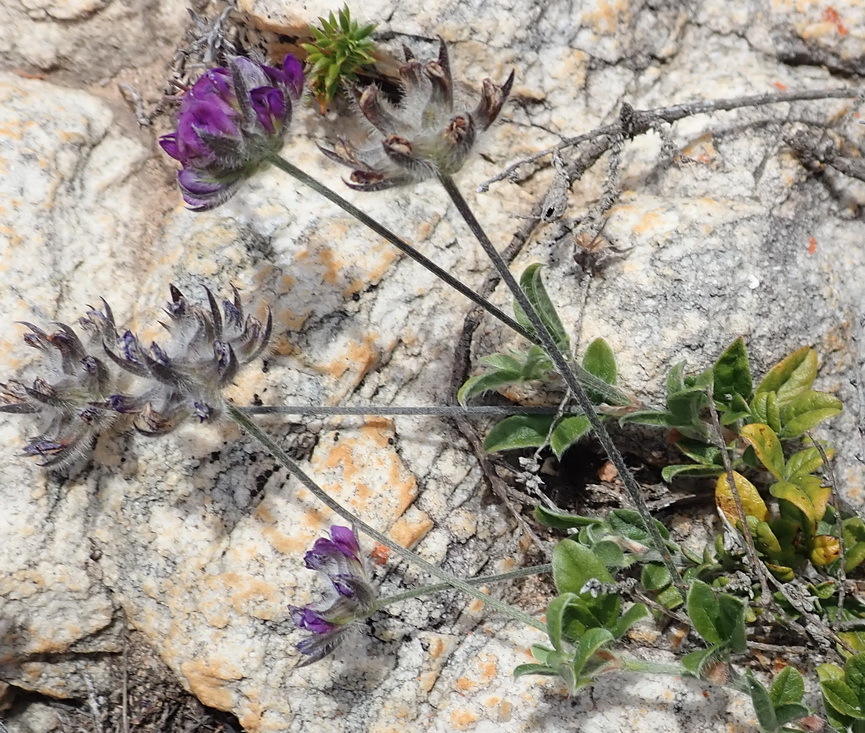

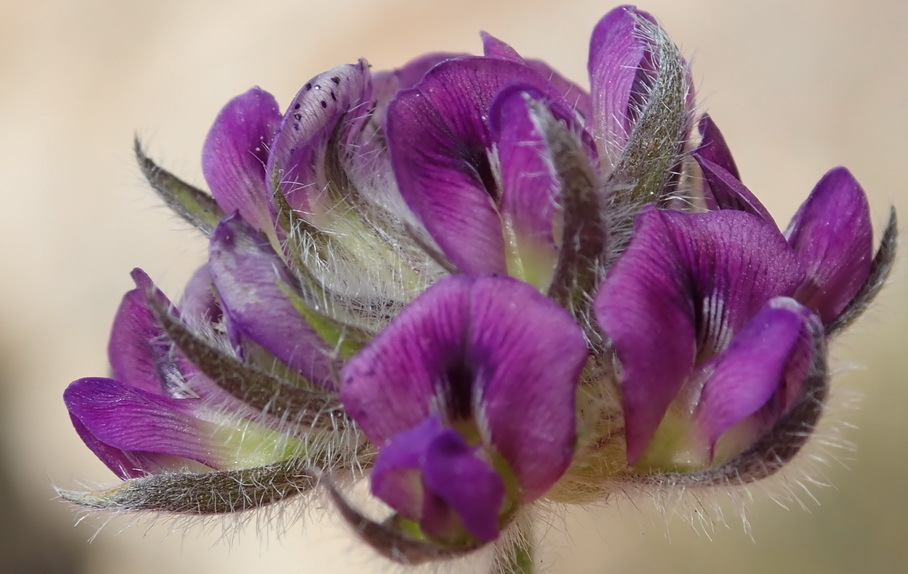

Conservation status
- Near Threatened (SANBI Red List)

Scientific classification
- Kingdom: Plantae
- Clade: Embryophytes
- Clade: Tracheophytes
- Clade: Angiosperms
- Clade: Eudicots
- Clade: Rosids
- Order: Fabales
- Family: Fabaceae
- Subfamily: Faboideae
- Genus: Psoralea
- Species: P. swartbergensis

Binomial name
- Psoralea swartbergensis (C.H.Stirt.) C.H.Stirt.

Synonyms
- Otholobium swartbergense C.H.Stirt.

= Psoralea swartbergensis =

Species of plant endemic to South Africa

Psoralea swartbergensis is a small spreading shrub assigned to the Pea family. All green parts are covered in hairs. It has many slender stems that are woody at their base, alternately set clover-like leaves and heads consisting of 6–15 mauve to purple, pea-like flowers on long peduncles in the axils of the leaves. This species is an endemic of the Swartberg mountains in the Western Cape province of South Africa. It mostly flowers in November and December.

== Taxonomy ==
Specimen of this small shrublet were first collected by the famous South African botanist Harry Bolus in 1904, high on the northern slopes of the Swartberg Pass. In 1986, Charles Stirton considered it sufficiently different from other Otholobium species, in particular O. sericeum, to distinguish and name it O. swartbergense. No synonyms are known. The name of the genus Otholobium is a combination of the Greek words ὠθέω (ōthéō) meaning to push and λοβός (lobos) meaning pod, which Stirton selected because its fruit seems to be pushed out of the calyx. In 2022 Stirton concluded that Otholobium is a synonym of Psoralea and renamed the species P. swartbergensis.

== Description ==
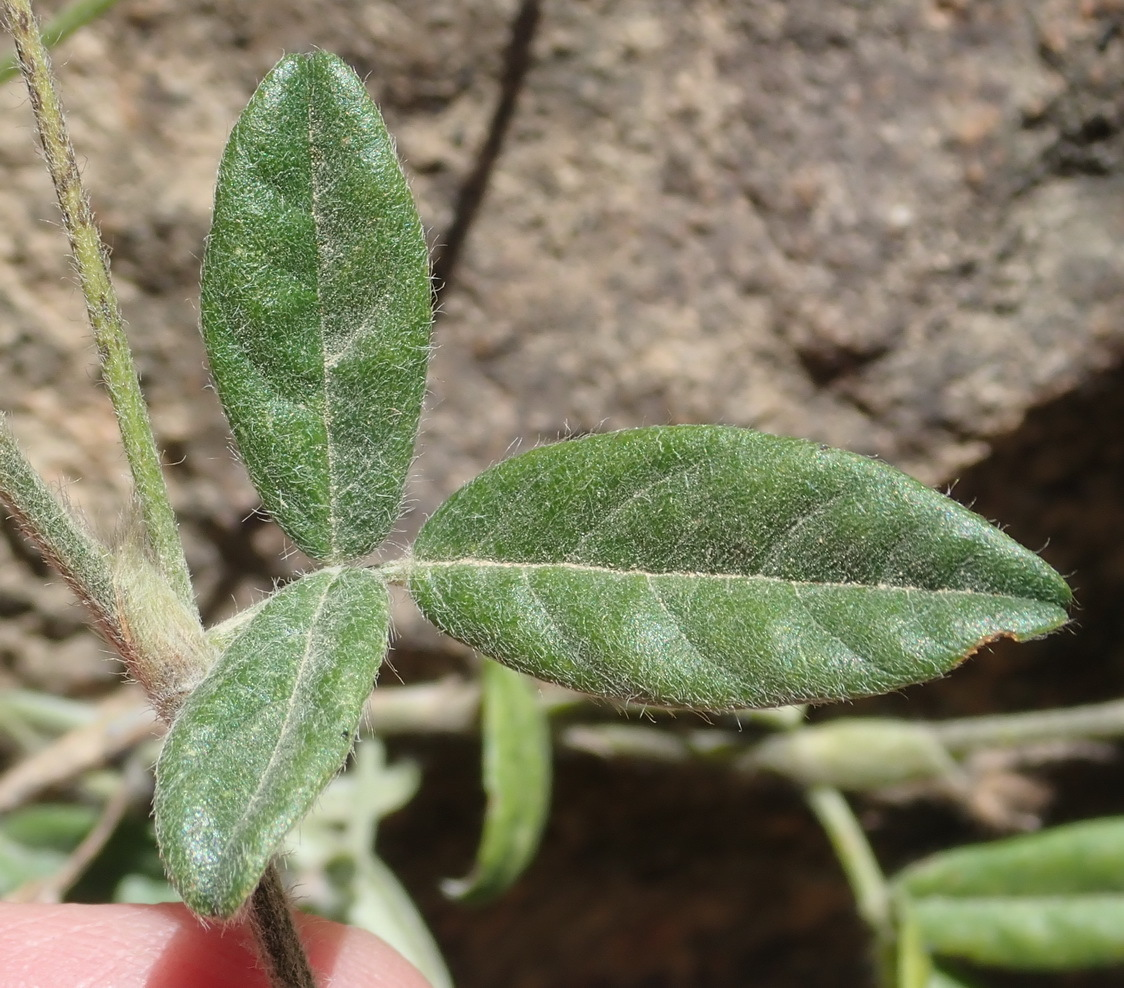
Leaf

Psoralea swartbergensis is a small spreading shrublet, with numerous slender stems that are covered in short hairs pointing toward the growing point and - particularly on the ribs - interspersed with longer, patent hairs. Its leaves are accompanied at their base by a pair of pointy, oval or shortly oblong, 5–7 mm (0.20–0.28 in) long and 18–30 mm (0.71–1.18 in) wide stipules, which are hairless on the inside and silky hairy on the outside. These stipules are partly merged with the base of the hairy petiole, which is about 5–7 mm (0.20–0.28 in) long. At its tip it carries three, flat, elliptical leaflets of 15–22 mm (0.59–0.87 in) long and about 6–8 mm (0.24–0.31 in) wide, with a blunt base, an entire margin and a tip that ends abruptly in a small, sharp, recurved point as a continuation of the midrib. The surface of the leaflets is silky hairy, more so on the lower surface and in particular along the veins. Leaflets become larger in leaves that are produced later in the growth season. The two leaflets to the sides are smaller than the one in the middle.

The flowers grow in roundish heads of 6-15 together on peduncles of 5–20 cm (2.0–7.9 in) long that emerge from the axils of the leaves. Each head consist of 2-5 triplets of flowers, the lowest of which is subtended by a semi-circular, hairy bract that divides in 2 or 3 teeth. These bracts gradually get narrower for triplets implanted further to the tip of the petiole. Each individual flower sits on a pedicel of 1.5–2.0 mm (0.059–0.079 in) long and is subtended by a very narrow bract. The flowers are each 8–11 mm (0.31–0.43 in) long. The five hairy 11–13 mm (0.43–0.51 in) long sepals are merged into a calyx tube at the base of 2.5–3.0 mm (0.098–0.118 in) long, end in separate teeth, and enclose the petals in the bud. The lower tooth, subtending the keel, is 9–10 mm (0.35–0.39 in) long and 3.0–3.5 mm (0.12–0.14 in) wide and has prominent netted veins. The remaining four teeth are all curved, narrowly triangular in shape, 5.5–6.0 mm (0.22–0.24 in) long and 1.5–2.0 mm (0.059–0.079 in) wide. As in all Faboideae, the corolla is zygomorphic, forms a specialized structure and consists of 5 free petals. The corollas are initially mauve in colour but become purple with age. The upper petal, called the banner or standard, is large and envelops the other petals in the bud. It is slightly netted, teardrop-shaped, 8–10 mm (0.31–0.39 in) long and 5.0–6.5 mm (0.20–0.26 in) wide and narrows into a 3 mm (0.12 in) long claw at its base. The standard gradually curves back along its length. The two adjacent lateral petals that are called wings are 9.5–10.0 mm (0.37–0.39 in) long, with a blade of 6–7 mm (0.24–0.28 in) long and 2.2–2.5 mm (0.087–0.098 in) wide and have a sculpturing of 15-18 irregularly parallel ridges and an ear-shaped appendage reaching beyond the attachment to the claw. The wings are longer than and enclose the 2 bottom petals, which together are called the keel. The two keel petals have long claws and form a boat-like structure. The keel petals are also divided into a claw and a blade section, and the latter is 8 mm (0.31 in) long and 2 mm (0.079 in) wide, and has a rounded tip. The keel contains 10 filaments. The 9 filaments that are fused are 8 mm (0.31 in) long, while the one that is loosely attached for half of its length is 7.5 mm (0.30 in) long. The anthers are alternately fixed to their filament at the base and at midlength. The filaments envelop a swollen style of 8 mm (0.31 in) long, which contains at its base an ovary of 1.5 mm (0.059 in) long with some glands and curves about 2 mm (0.079 in) upwards before becoming the pin-shaped, papillose stigma.

== Distribution and conservation ==
Psoralea swartbergensis is considered a near-threatened species because it is known from six locations only and may suffer from competition by invasive plants. Here it grows on sandstone slopes along seeps and on the bank of streamlets in a vegetation type called Sandstone Fynbos.
