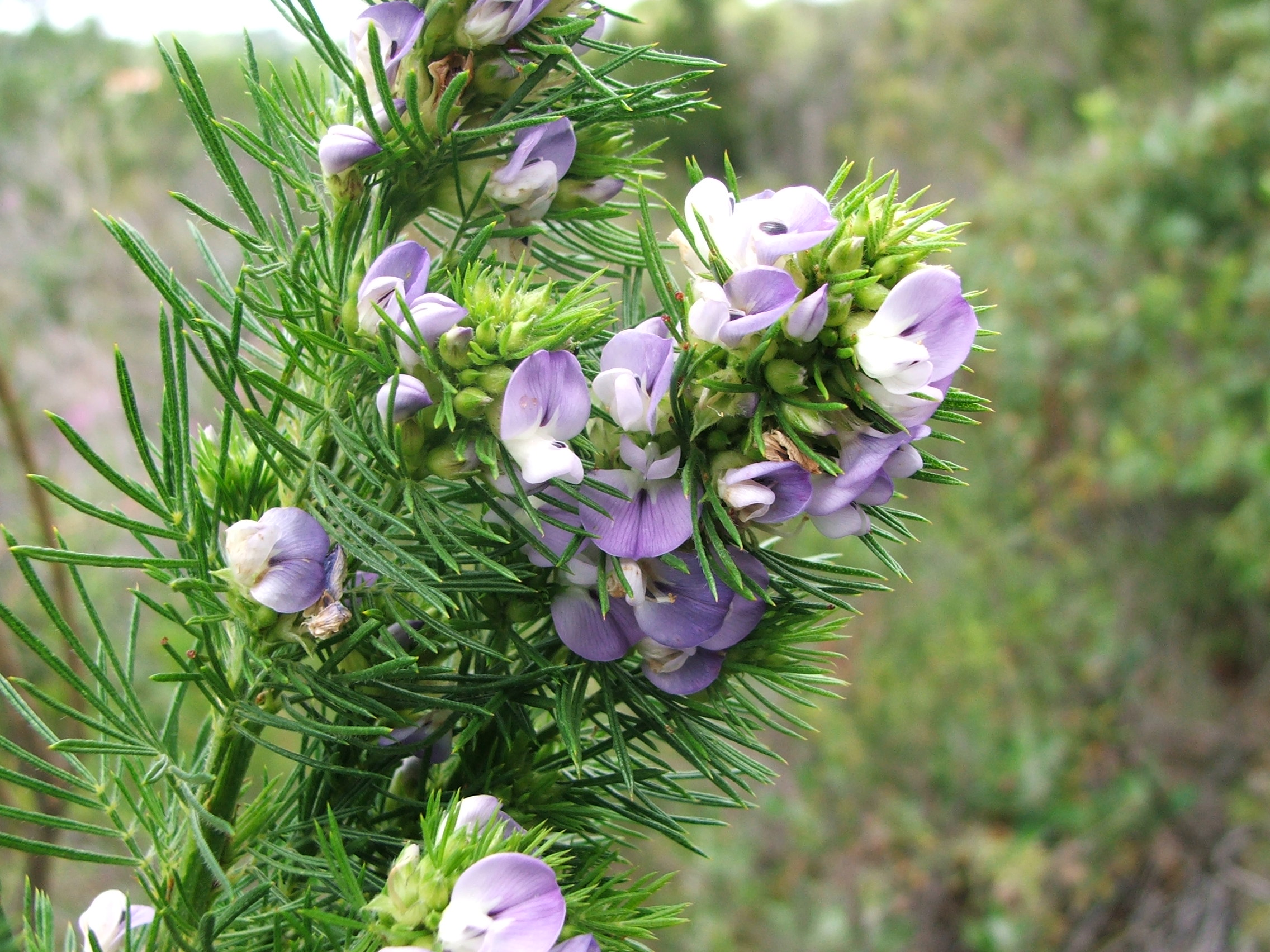
- P. pinnata

Scientific classification
- Kingdom: Plantae
- Clade: Tracheophytes
- Clade: Angiosperms
- Clade: Eudicots
- Clade: Rosids
- Order: Fabales
- Family: Fabaceae
- Subfamily: Faboideae
- Clade: Non-protein amino acid-accumulating clade
- Clade: Millettioids
- Tribe: Psoraleeae
- Genus: Psoralea; L. (1753)

Species
- 127; see text

Synonyms
- Bipontinia Alef. (1866); Hallia Thunb. (1799); Lotodes Kuntze (1891), nom. superfl.; Otholobium C.H.Stirt. (1981); Ruteria Medik. (1787)

= Psoralea =

Genus of legumes

Psoralea is a genus in the legume family (Fabaceae) with 121 species of shrubs, trees, and herbs native to southern and eastern Africa, ranging from Kenya to South Africa. In South Africa they are commonly referred to as fountainbush (English); fonteinbos, bloukeur, or penwortel (Afrikaans); and umHlonishwa (Zulu).

== Etymology ==
The name ‘Psoralea’ is derived from the Greek term ‘Psoraleos’, which means “affected with itch or with leprosy”. Psoralen occurs naturally in the seeds of Psoralea corylifolia, and is used in PUVA (psoralen + UVA) treatment, for several diseases including such as psoriasis.

== Species ==
127 species are accepted:

- Psoralea abbottii C.H.Stirt.
- Psoralea accrescens (C.H.Stirt. & Muasya) C.H.Stirt.
- Psoralea acocksii C.H.Stirt. & Muasya
- Psoralea aculeata L.
- Psoralea acuminata Lam.
- Psoralea affinis Eckl. & Zeyh.
- Psoralea afra Eckl. & Zeyh.
- Psoralea alata (Thunb.) T.M.Salter
- Psoralea albidula C.H.Stirt. & Muasya
- Psoralea angustifolia L'Hér.
- Psoralea aphylla L.
- Psoralea arborea Sims
- Psoralea arborescens (C.H.Stirt.) C.H.Stirt.
- Psoralea argentea Thunb.
- Psoralea asarina (P.J.Bergius) T.M.Salter
- Psoralea axillaris L.f.
- Psoralea azuroides C.H.Stirt.
- Psoralea bolusii H.M.L.Forbes
- Psoralea bowieana Harv.
- Psoralea bracteolata Eckl. & Zeyh.
- Psoralea brilliantissima C.H.Stirt., Muasya & A.Bello
- Psoralea candicans Eckl. & Zeyh.
- Psoralea cataracta C.H.Stirt.
- Psoralea congesta C.H.Stirt. & Muasya
- Psoralea crista C.H.Stirt. & Muasya
- Psoralea curtisiae (C.H.Stirt. & Muasya) C.H.Stirt.
- Psoralea diturnerae A. Bello, C.H. Stirt. & Muasya
- Psoralea dreweae (C.H.Stirt. & Muasya) C.H.Stirt.
- Psoralea elegans C.H.Stirt.
- Psoralea ensifolia (Houtt.) Merr.
- Psoralea fascicularis DC., syns. Psoralea tenuifolia Thunb. and Psoralea thunbergiana Eckl. & Zeyh.
- Psoralea filifolia Eckl. & Zeyh.
- Psoralea fleta C.H.Stirt.
- Psoralea flexuosa (C.H.Stirt.) C.H.Stirt.
- Psoralea floccosa C.H.Stirt., Muasya & A.Bello
- Psoralea foliosa Oliv.
- Psoralea forbesiae C.H.Stirt., A.Bello & Muasya
- Psoralea fruticans (L.) Druce
- Psoralea fulva C.H.Stirt. & Muasya
- Psoralea fumea (C.H.Stirt.) C.H.Stirt.
- Psoralea gigantea Dludlu, Muasya & C.H.Stirt.
- Psoralea glabra E.Mey.
- Psoralea glaucescens Eckl. & Zeyh.
- Psoralea glaucina Harv.
- Psoralea gueinzii Harv.
- Psoralea hamata Harv.
- Psoralea heterosepala Fourc.
- Psoralea hirta L.
- Psoralea imbricata (L.f.) T.M.Salter
- Psoralea imminens C.H.Stirt.
- Psoralea implexa C.H.Stirt.
- Psoralea intonsa C.H.Stirt., Muasya & A.Bello
- Psoralea ivumba C.H.Stirt., A.Bello & Muasya
- Psoralea karooensis C.H.Stirt., Muasya & Vlok
- Psoralea keetii Schönland ex H.M.L.Forbes
- Psoralea kougaensis C.H.Stirt., Muasya & A.Bello
- Psoralea laevigata L.f.
- Psoralea lancifolia C.H.Stirt. & Muasya
- Psoralea laxa T.M.Salter
- Psoralea lucens (C.H.Stirt. & Muasya) C.H.Stirt.
- Psoralea luteovirens C.H.Stirt. & Muasya
- Psoralea margaretiflora C.H.Stirt. & V.R.Clark
- Psoralea monophylla (L.) C.H.Stirt.
- Psoralea montana A.Bello, C.H.Stirt. & Muasya
- Psoralea muirii C.H.Stirt. & Muasya
- Psoralea mundiana Eckl. & Zeyh.
- Psoralea nitens (C.H.Stirt. & Muasya) C.H.Stirt.
- Psoralea nubicola C.H.Stirt. & Muasya
- Psoralea obliqua E.Mey.
- Psoralea odoratissima Jacq.
- Psoralea oligophylla Eckl. & Zeyh.
- Psoralea oreophila Schltr.
- Psoralea oreopola C.H.Stirt.
- Psoralea outrampsii (C.H.Stirt. & du Preez) C.H.Stirt.
- Psoralea pallescens C.H.Stirt. & Muasya
- Psoralea papillosa C.H.Stirt. & Muasya
- Psoralea peratica C.H.Stirt.
- Psoralea picta (C.H.Stirt.) C.H.Stirt.
- Psoralea pilifera (C.H.Stirt. & Muasya) C.H.Stirt.
- Psoralea pinnata L.
- Psoralea platyphylla C.H.Stirt.
- Psoralea plauta C.H.Stirt.
- Psoralea polyphylla Eckl. & Zeyh.
- Psoralea polysticta Benth. ex Harv.
- Psoralea prodiens (C.H.Stirt. & Muasya) C.H.Stirt.
- Psoralea prompta C.H.Stirt. & Muasya
- Psoralea psammophila C.H.Stirt. & Muasya
- Psoralea pullata C.H.Stirt.
- Psoralea pungens (C.H.Stirt.) C.H.Stirt.
- Psoralea purpurascens C.H.Stirt. & Muasya
- Psoralea racemosa Thunb.
- Psoralea ramulosa C.H.Stirt.
- Psoralea repens P.J.Bergius
- Psoralea restioides Eckl. & Zeyh.
- Psoralea reticulata C.H.Stirt. & Muasya
- Psoralea rhizotoma C.H.Stirt. & Muasya
- Psoralea rigidula C.H.Stirt.
- Psoralea rotundifolia L.f.
- Psoralea rubicunda (C.H.Stirt.) C.H.Stirt.
- Psoralea sabulosa (C.H.Stirt. & Muasya) C.H.Stirt.
- Psoralea saxosa (C.H.Stirt. & Muasya) C.H.Stirt.
- Psoralea schutteae C.H.Stirt.
- Psoralea semota C.H.Stirt.
- Psoralea sericea Poir.
- Psoralea sordida C.H.Stirt. & Muasya
- Psoralea speciosa Eckl. & Zeyh.
- Psoralea spicata L.
- Psoralea spissa (C.H.Stirt. & Muasya) C.H.Stirt.
- Psoralea stachyera Eckl. & Zeyh.
- Psoralea striata Thunb.
- Psoralea suaveolens C.H.Stirt., A.Bello & Muasya
- Psoralea swartbergensis (C.H.Stirt.) C.H.Stirt.
- Psoralea tenuifolia L.
- Psoralea tenuissima E.Mey.
- Psoralea thomii Harv.
- Psoralea triantha E.Mey.
- Psoralea triflora Thunb.
- Psoralea trullata C.H.Stirt.
- Psoralea uncinata Eckl. & Zeyh.
- Psoralea usitata C.H.Stirt.
- Psoralea vanberkeliae C.H.Stirt., A.Bello & Muasya
- Psoralea velutina E.Mey.
- Psoralea venusta Eckl. & Zeyh.
- Psoralea verrucosa Willd. ex Spreng.
- Psoralea vlokii C.H.Stirt. & Muasya
- Psoralea wilmsii Harms
- Psoralea zeyheri Harv.
