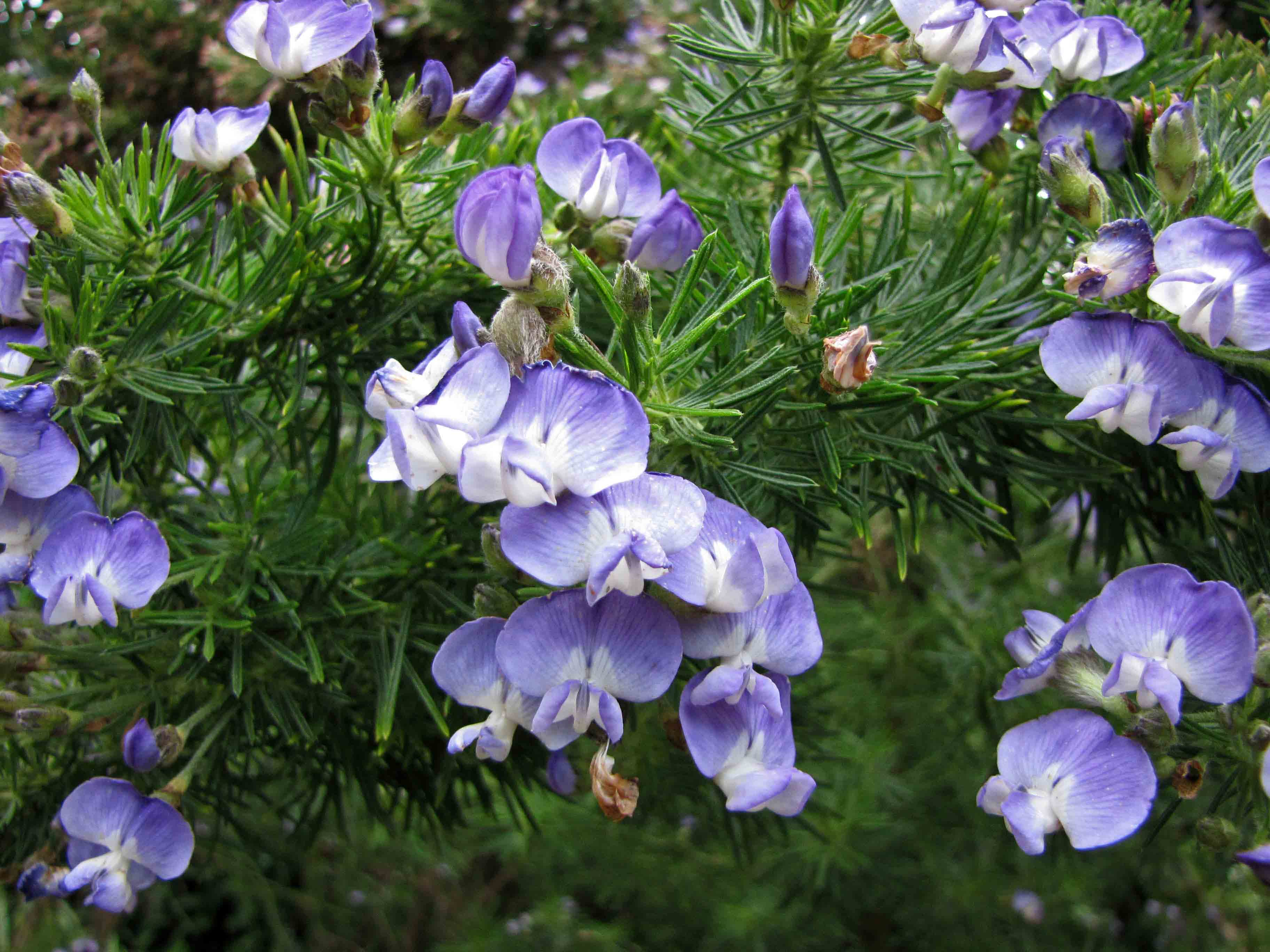

Conservation status
- Data Deficient (IUCN 2.3)

Scientific classification
- Kingdom: Plantae
- Clade: Tracheophytes
- Clade: Angiosperms
- Clade: Eudicots
- Clade: Rosids
- Order: Fabales
- Family: Fabaceae
- Subfamily: Faboideae
- Genus: Psoralea
- Species: P. arborea

Binomial name
- Psoralea arborea Sims (1819)

Synonyms
- Psoralea biflora Rudolph (1800), nom. rej. prop.; Psoralea pinnata var. quinquijuga Eckl. & Zeyh. (1836)

= Psoralea arborea =

Species of legume

Psoralea arborea is a species of legume in the family Fabaceae. It is a shrub or tree endemic to the Cape Provinces of South Africa.

The species Psoralea arborea Sessé & Moc. is unplaced.

== Sources ==
- Victor, J.E. 2005. Psoralea arborea Sims. National Assessment: Red List of South African Plants version 2020.1. Retrieved 21 July 2021.
