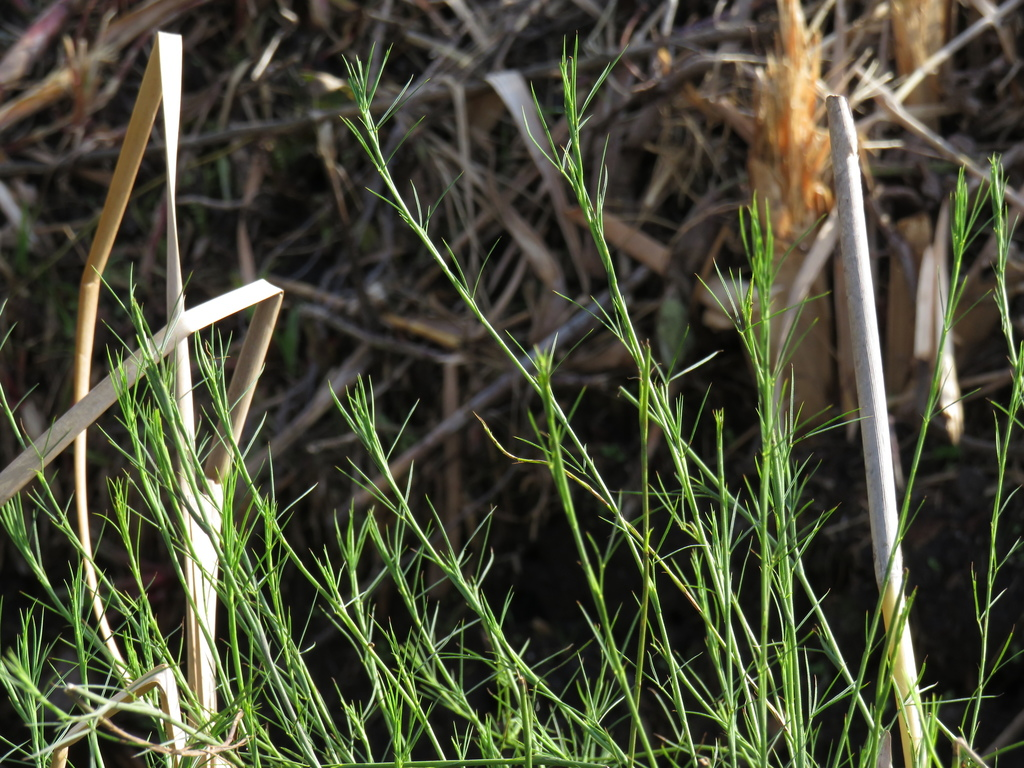
- Psoralea fascicularis in habitat on the Soetvlei Greenbelt, Cape Town

Conservation status
- Endangered (IUCN 3.1)

Scientific classification
- Kingdom: Plantae
- Clade: Tracheophytes
- Clade: Angiosperms
- Clade: Eudicots
- Clade: Rosids
- Order: Fabales
- Family: Fabaceae
- Subfamily: Faboideae
- Genus: Psoralea
- Species: P. fascicularis

Binomial name
- Psoralea fascicularis DC. (1825)

Synonyms
- Lotodes fasciculare (DC.) Kuntze; Lotus tenuifolius Burm.f.; Psoralea tenuifolia Thunb.; Psoralea thunbergiana Eckl. & Zeyh.

= Psoralea fascicularis =

Species plant

Psoralea fascicularis, the large-stipule fountainbush, is a species in the pea or Fabaceae family. It is endemic to the Western Cape province of South Africa where it has been red listed as endangered (EN) by the International Union for Conservation of Nature (IUCN) Red List of Threatened Species (also known as the IUCN Red List or Red Data Book) due to its declining population.

== History ==
Psoralea fascicularis was described first by Swiss botanist Augustin Pyramus de Candolle in 1825.

== Derivation of names ==
The genus name Psoralea is based upon the Greek word "psoraleos", which translates to "warty"; referring to the wart-like structures found on the bark of some of the species. The species name "fascicularis" translates to mean either a bundle, tuft, or close cluster. It does not appear to be specific as to what this refers to exactly, although it may be the "bundled" nature of the species due to its resprouting habit.

Vernacular or common names for this species include: whine fountainbush, fascicled fountainbush, and large-stipule fountainbush. It also does not appear to be specified as to what the common name of "whine" fountainbush refers to, although it may be a misunderstanding of "wine" in reference to the expanding vineyards around Stellenbosch that have led to localised extinctions of this species in the area. Nonetheless, "fascicled" fountainbush is a direct translation from the specific epithet, "fascicularis" (meaning "bundled"). This may be referring to the impression that the trifoliate leaves give. "Large-stipule" fountainbush evidentially refers to the conspicuously large stipules found on the species.

== Description ==
The plant is described a low, re-sprouting perennial "sub-shrub"; meaning that it is quite small. Branches are long, incurved, and densely leafy. Leaves glabrous (devoid of hairs) and tri-foliate with the leaflets narrowly lanceolate in shape; tapering off to an extraordinarily acute tip. Conspicuously large stipules occur to the base of the petiole or leaf-stalk - hence the common or vernacular name of large-stipule fountainbush. The inflorescence is loosely capitate up the stem and pedicels or flower stalks long and axillary, with several clustered up the shoot. The small flowers are indigo in colour with the upper banner petals displaying two white spots in the centre, each adjacent to one another. The wing petals can be much longer than the keel and standard petals. Flowering lasts from September to December.

== Distribution ==
Endemic to the Western Cape province of South Africa, the species is found at just a few locations ranging from the Cape Peninsula in Cape Town to the Shaw's Mountains east of Hermanus. It is perhaps most well-known from the Stellenbosch-Jonkershoek area (including the Hottentots Holland Mountains).

== Habitat ==
It is most often found growing in moist areas in mountain and lowland fynbos, and renosterveld.

== Status and threats ==
Psoralea fascicularis is threatened by alien invasive plant species along Shaw's Pass, as well as expanding agriculture and urbanisation - especially around Stellenbosch where there have already been numerous local extinctions of the species.

== Uses ==
Although its bioactive principles and mode of action have not yet been explored, P. fascicularis has been reported as toxic to horses and cattle. It is thus not used as fodder for livestock.

Psoralea species in general can harbour a great potential in acting as panacea to some diseases and ailments. It is therefore essential that the further conservation of these species takes place before even more excessive exploitation is done.
