= Gynophore =

A gynophore is the stalk of certain flowers which supports the gynoecium (the ovule-producing part of a flower), elevating it above the branching points of other floral parts.

Plant genera that have flowers with gynophores include Telopea, Peritoma arborea and Brachychiton.

gynophore and stipitate gynoecium
