= Auricle (botany) =

Small ear-like projection from the base of a leaf or petal

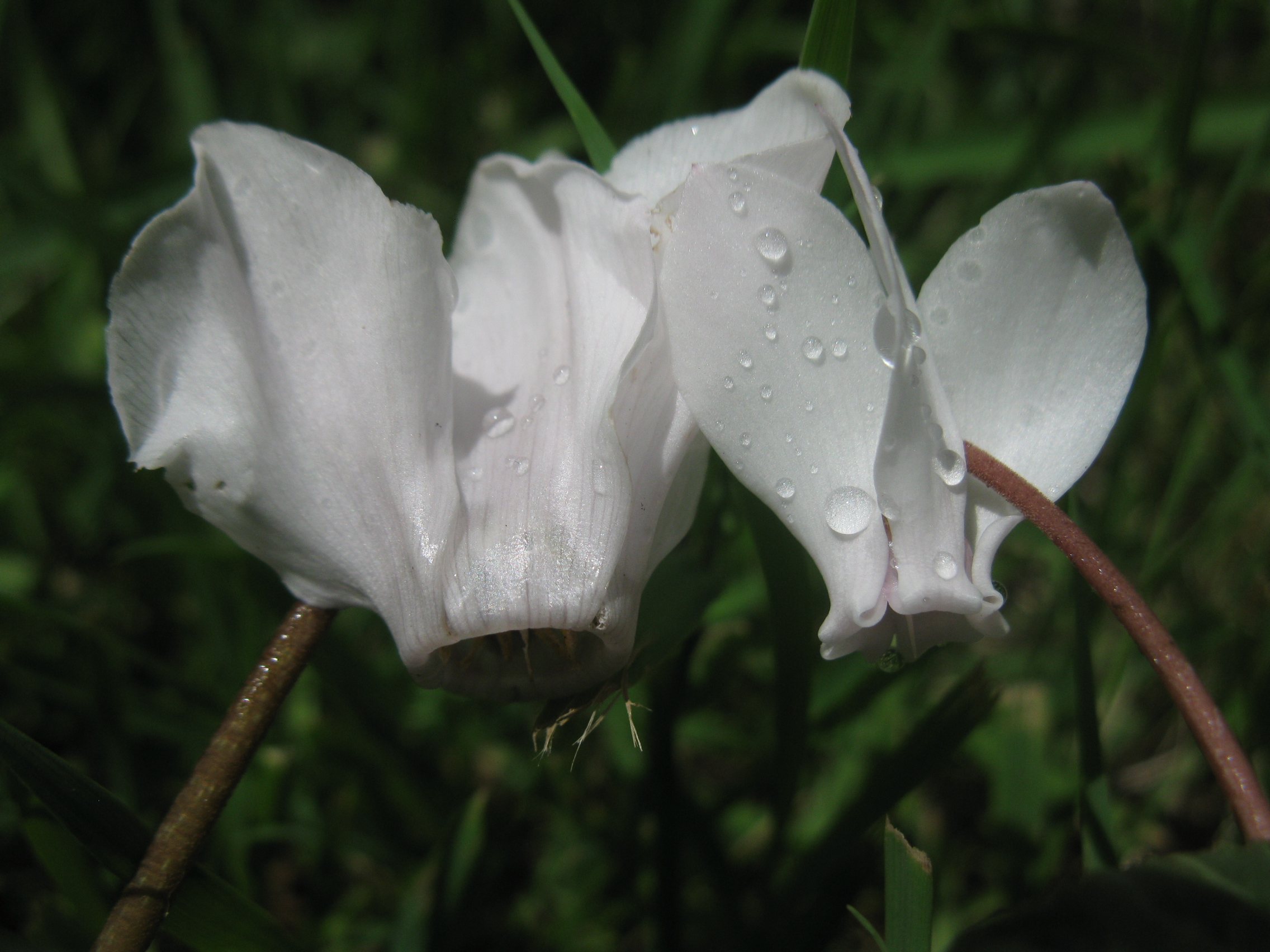
Two species of cyclamen: without auricle (left); with auricles at bases of petals (right)

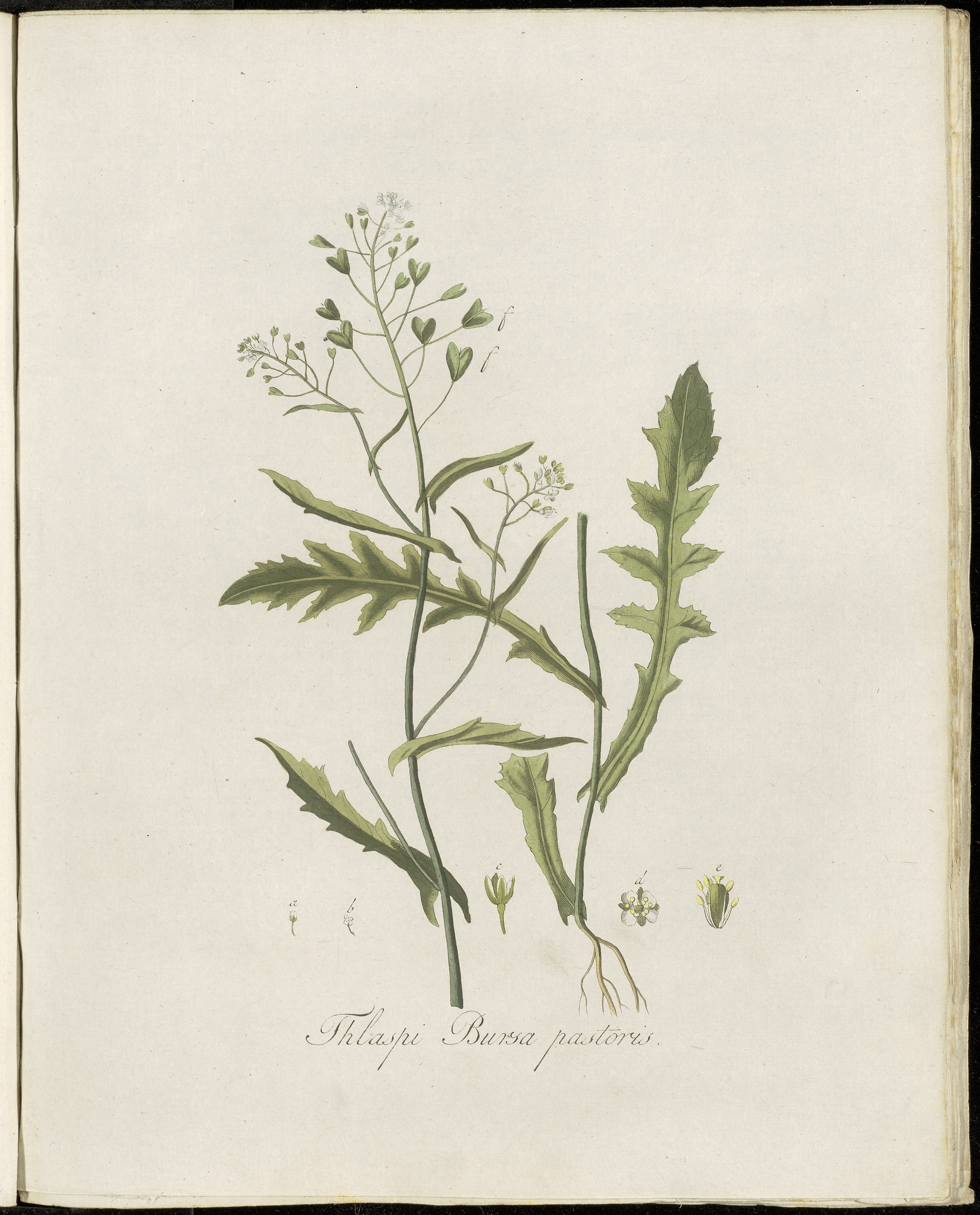
Auricles at the base of stem leaves of Capsella bursa-pastoris, shepherd's purse.

In botany, an auricle is a small ear-like projection from the base of a leaf or petal. They are often important when identifying plants, especially grasses. Auricles may clasp the stem or be free, and may have hairs.
