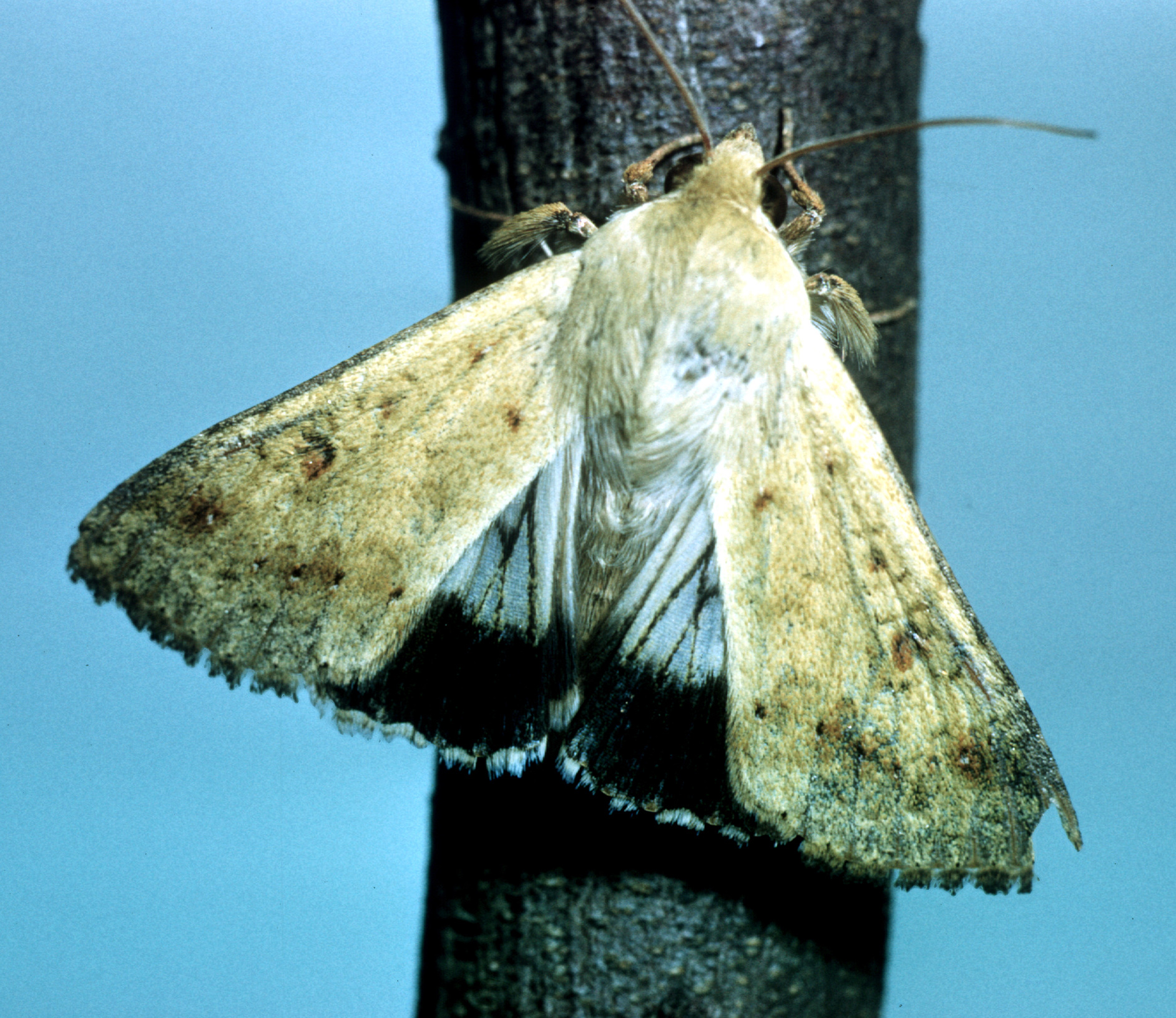

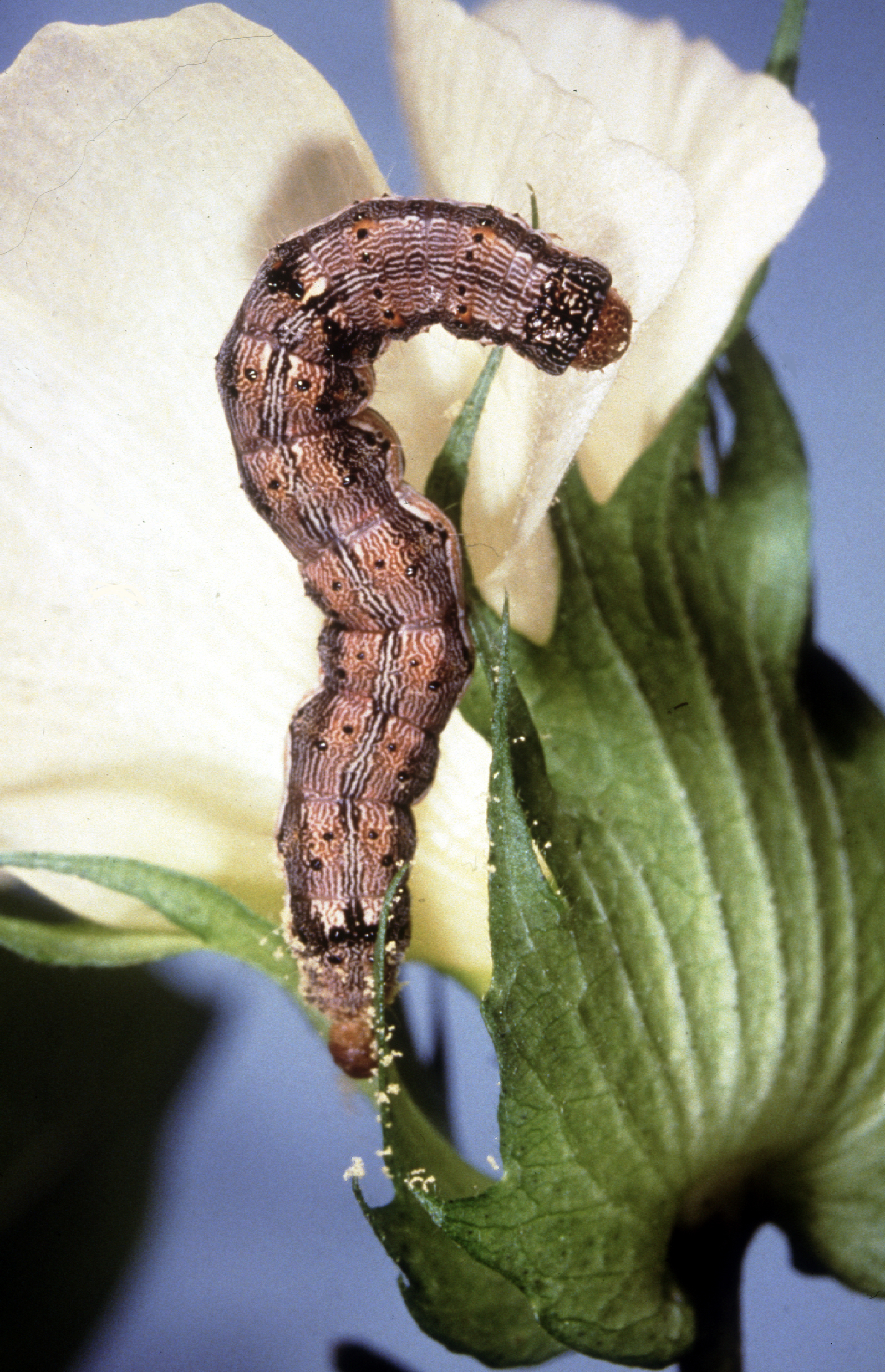

Scientific classification
- Kingdom: Animalia
- Phylum: Arthropoda
- Clade: Pancrustacea
- Class: Insecta
- Order: Lepidoptera
- Superfamily: Noctuoidea
- Family: Noctuidae
- Genus: Helicoverpa
- Species: H. punctigera

Binomial name
- Helicoverpa punctigera (Wallengren, 1860)

Synonyms
- Heliothis punctigera Wallengren, 1860; Chloridea marmada Swinhoe, 1918

= Helicoverpa punctigera =

Species of moth

Helicoverpa punctigera, the native budworm, Australian bollworm or Chloridea marmada, is a species of moth in the family Noctuidae. This species is native to Australia. H. punctigera are capable of long-distance migration from their inland Australian habitat towards coastal regions and are an occasional migrant to New Zealand.

This species is a generalist, with larvae observed feeding on at least 100 plant species, and are considered a pest for tobacco, flax, peas, sunflower, cotton, maize, tomatoes and other crops. Outside of agricultural settings, primary host plants include some Australian native daisies, in particular flat billy buttons Leiocarpa brevicompta, annual yellow tops Senecio gregorii, poached egg daisy Polycamma stuartii, and also the native legume Cullen cinereum. Helicoverpa punctigera is often compared to its cousin species H. armigera who unlike H. punctigera has developed resistance to certain insecticides and other genetically modified cotton crops. The two species can occasionally be confused with one another as they look similar. However, the two species can be differentiated by characteristic differences in their hindwings. H. punctigera is often confused with two other moth species of the family Noctuidae – the Armyworm Moth (Mythimna unipuncta) and the Looper Moth – due to the medium-sized nature of the three species.

== Taxonomy ==
Helicoverpa punctigera was first described in 1860 by Wallengren. The subject of classification has changed over the years. Originally classified into the Heliothis genus, this moth species was later re-classified into the Helicoverpa genus. The earliest record of H. punctigera in South Australia was in 1910 when it was referred to as "Grubby Tomatoes".

== Description ==
=== Eggs ===
Helicoverpa punctigera egg are spherical in shape and 0.5 millimetres (3/128 in) in diameter. While its colours vary based on the stage of larval development. The eggs are initially white, before turning brown and finally black shortly before hatching.

=== Larvae ===
Newly hatched larvae are observed to be 1–2 millimetres (3/64–5/64 in) in length and will grow up to 40 millimetres (1 1/2 in) in length. Observed to be various shades of brown, green and orange, the larvae's colour darkens as it matures and the dark spots on it become more apparent. The H. punctigera larva's body is covered in small bumps, long stiff back hairs and bristles that cover its body and there are black hairs around the head.

=== Pupae ===
Helicoverpa punctigera pupae range from dark brown to shiny brown in colour.

=== Adult ===
Compared to other moths, the adult H. punctigera is average in size, having a wingspan of 30 to 45 millimetres (1 1/4 to 1 3/4 in). While the male H. punctigera generally have dull green or yellow forewings, the female H. punctigera have brown or reddish-brown forewings. The adult H. punctigera strongly resembles the adult H. armigera except for its hindwing pattern: H. punctigera have a uniformly dark section in the hindwing, whereas H. armigera have a small pale patch here.

== Life cycle ==
=== Eggs ===
H. punctigera eggs observe four stages in their development. The stages can be identified based on the colour of the egg. Freshly laid eggs are white and over time. In warmer climates, the eggs take approximately three days to hatch, while in colder climates, they take between six and ten days to hatch.

=== Larvae ===
H. punctigera larvae pass through six stages of growth before reaching the pupa stage. With a warmer temperature, they will reach the final stage within two to three weeks, while under colder temperature, they take about four to six weeks. The caterpillars have been shown experimentally to distinguish between host plant species when moving across the ground, and readily move between nearby plants.

=== Pupae ===
Prepupae larvae (larvae after the 6th growth stage) tunnel up to 10 centimetres (4 in) under the soil to the base of the plant. The pupal chamber constructed will allow the H. punctigera to resurface when in adult stage. The pupal tunnels constructed are smoothed, well-packed soil with a thin layer of silk. The prepupae larvae avoid selecting soil locations where the temperature is higher than 38 degrees and have compacted soil. The emergence of the adult is highly favoured by dry conditions. Rain and other external conditions that might collapse the tunnel reduces the survival rate of the adult H. punctigera due to the disruption of emergence.

The pupation process relies on the external temperature. In warmer temperatures, the pupation process takes approximately two weeks. While in colder temperatures, up to six weeks. During colder seasons, 70% to 90% of the pupae enter diapause. Pupae Diapause is the process in which the pupae development to the adult stage is suspended due to inhibiting or unfavourable environmental conditions.

=== Adult ===
The adult Helicoverpa punctigera moth feeds on nectar after emerging from the pupae. Their adult lifespan is limited to ten days where they mate and lay their eggs before dying. The female typically lay their eggs either in clusters or singly on various developing fruit and flower buds. Each adult female lays approximately 1000 eggs during its lifecycle. Adult Helicoverpa punctigera moths typically live between two and four weeks. As they are nocturnal, they rest during the day and are active at night

==== Reproduction ====
Belonging to the insecta class of animals, the H. punctigera follows an oviposition behaviour where it expulses its eggs by a vertebrate. Oviposition is the expulsion of eggs from the female insecta's oviduct to an external environment. While the Oviposition behaviour is unrelated to the feeding habits of the female H. punctigera, the female H. punctigera tends to lay its eggs in areas with more flowering crops than in other areas. This is mainly due to the female H. punctigera feeding habits as the food chain is crucial in the reproductive cycle of the H. punctigera. Any factors affecting the food supply during their reproduction period (usually in summer) would determine the reproductive potential of the H. punctigera specials. Despite the H. punctigera feeding habits however, the female H. punctigera is able to lay its eggs anywhere and at any time of day.

The selection of area is also crucial to the survival of the eggs and larvae of the H. punctigera. Selecting an area in the open will lead to the eggs and larvae being susceptible to various predatory insects and animals. Furthermore, selecting an area without sufficient food would mean that the larvae would not have enough to feed on as well.

== Migration ==
Helicoverpa punctigera is capable of long-range migration at high altitudes (400 to 800 metres (1,312 to 2,625 ft)) over host crops (1 to 10 kilometres (1/2 to 6 mi)) in addition to entire regions (10 to 500 kilometres (6 to 311 mi)). With long-distance flight being possible for the H. punctigera, their habitats are generally observed to be temporary once the H. punctigera reaches the adult stage of the life cycle. It is noted that the H. punctigera are found in abundance in the far inland and around the coast of Australia during the summer period. This is heavily due to the climate being favourable for the reproduction in summer.

As of 2010 there was research regarding the migration of the H. punctigera, but it was difficult to test for the back-migration of H. punctigera. That was primarily due to there being a gradual migration of the population and there being no appropriate markers to track individual H. punctigera. As of 2019 tracking had been greatly improved by advances in radar, population genetics markers, and dispersal modeling.

== Ecology ==
=== Mutualism ===
As a member of the Noctuidae family, H. punctigera plays a part in the pollination process of plants.

=== Food guilds ===
H. punctigera particularly feed on high value crops such as cotton, soybean, maize, and tomato and various other horticultural hosts.

In the early larvae stages, the H. punctigera feed on seeds and damage plant pods while in the mid to late stages of development, the larger H. punctigera larvae are able to consume entire plant pods and their contents.

=== Defence ===
When disturbed, the H. punctigera lifts its head and curls it below the front of itself. If disturbed further, it lets go of the leaf it resides on and drops while curling itself up into a spiral shape.

== Economics ==
=== Agricultural impact ===
While in the larval stage, H. punctigera cause farmers to lose millions of dollars' worth of crops due to their polyphagous eating habits. They prefer eating mostly broadleaf species of plants such as cotton, chickpea and various native herbs in addition to a broad selection of other various pastures. The further the H. punctigera larvae are in the growth stage, the more the larvae consume. When in the 5th and 6th instars, the H. punctigera larvae consume 90% of the grain consumption the H. punctigera consumes in its life cycle.

When the H. punctigera consumes crops, chewing damage and holes can be observed on the plant pods and seed heads.

=== Control measures ===
==== Pheromone traps ====
Various pest control measures have been implemented. Including the use of pheromone traps. Pheromone traps use synthetic pheromone lures (similar to the sex pheromones that females emit while mating) to lure the male punctigera into the trap. In addition to trapping the adult H. punctigera, pheromone traps are often used to monitor the activity of and predict the infestation rate of H. punctigera and other moths.

==== Genetically Modified Crops ====
Unlike the closely related H. armigera, H. punctigera has not developed any resistance to majority of the chemical control measures created. Genetically modified Cotton plants such as the Bollgard II® and the Bollarrd 3® are genetically modified plants that are used to deal with the H. punctigera larvae. These genetically modified plants produce their own Bacillus thuringiensis toxin that are toxic to the H. punctigera larvae.

==== Insecticides ====
Research has shown that at the different instar (stages of development) stages of the H. punctigera, various insecticides have different levels of effectiveness with significant differences being observed through the various instar stages. (Source) Endosulfan used to be one of the components used in H. punctigera insecticides before its ban in 2011. In addition to chemical pesticides, various Biopesticides have been created to manage H. punctigera in vegetation and field crops.

A particularly effective biopesticide is nucleopolyhedrovirus (NPV) which is a disease that will attack the H. punctigera larvae. While larger doses and more time is required to kill the larvae at the later instar stages, the NPV biopesticide typically kills the larvae between 4 and 7 days. The climate in which this it is used impacts the time taken for NPV to be take effect. Where in cooler climates, it can take up to 10 days to kill the H. punctigera larvae.

==== Predators, parasitoids and pathogens ====
Spiders and predatory insects including various species of ants, predatory beetles, predatory bugs and lacewings often feed on the H. punctigera genus of moth. While a proportion of the H. punctigera predators do not specifically prey on the H. punctigera, certain predators' prey on specific life stages of the H. punctigera (e.g., larvae).

Various parasitoids attack the H. punctigera at various life stages. These parasitoids slowly kill their host by feeding off its nutrients effectively slowing the rate of larvae feeding resulting in lower rate of crop damage. Parasitoids that attack the H. punctigera include the Trichogramma and Ichneumon genera of wasps and Cacelia genus of flies.

Wasp parasitoids spread ascovirus to larval H. punctigera stunting their growth. Other natural occurring diseases that kill the Helicoverpa larvae include fungal pathogens, Nuclear Polyhedrosis Virus (NPV) and Bacillus thuringiensis which creates proteins that are toxic to the larvae when consumed. Some genetically modified bacterial pathogens are used in commercial biopesticides. A popularly used pathogen is Bacillus thuringiensis (Bt) which mainly kills larval Lepidopterans when consumed. It is used in pesticides and when genetically modifying cotton plants.
