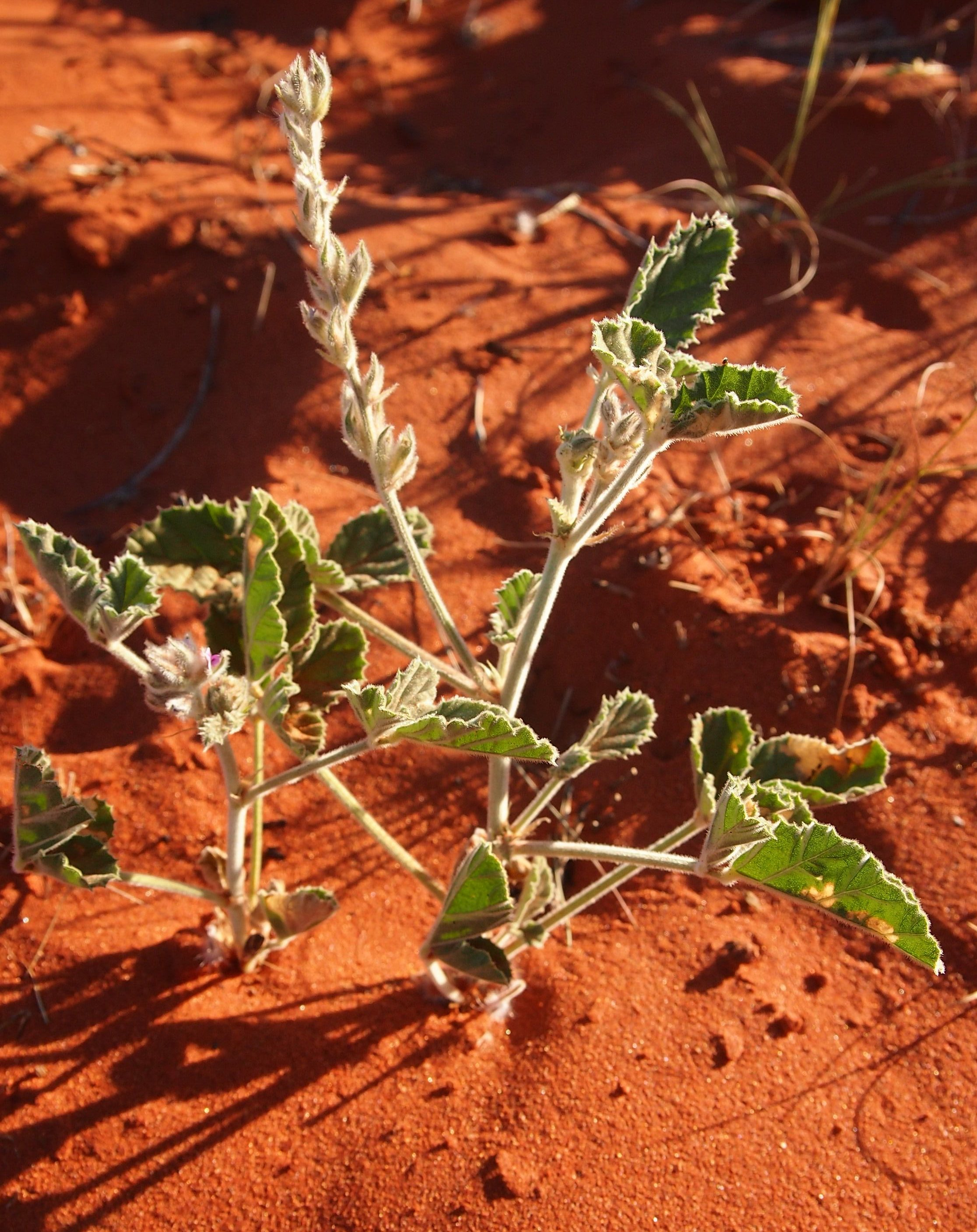
- Structure
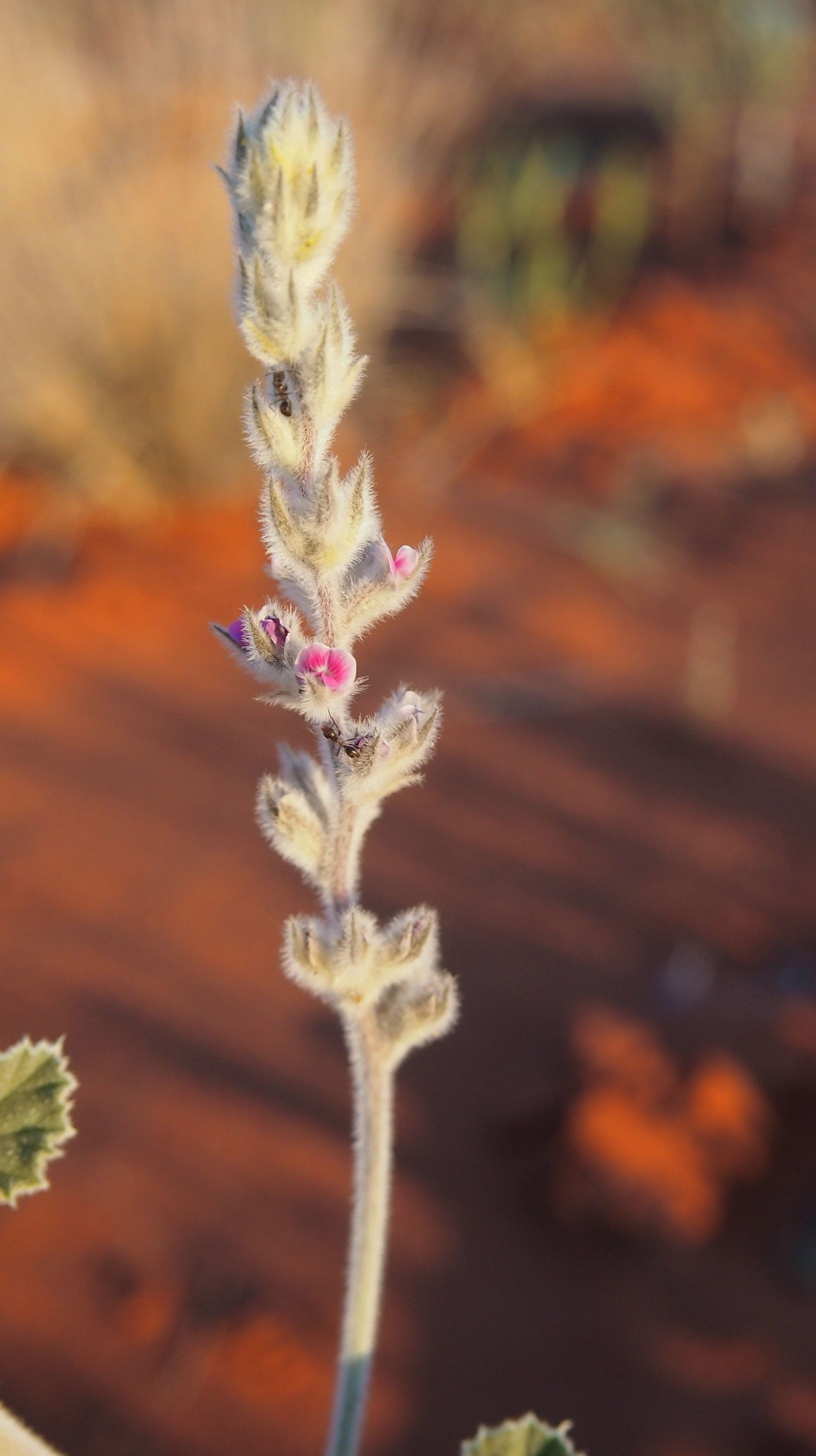
- Flower

Scientific classification
- Kingdom: Plantae
- Clade: Tracheophytes
- Clade: Angiosperms
- Clade: Eudicots
- Clade: Rosids
- Order: Fabales
- Family: Fabaceae
- Subfamily: Faboideae
- Genus: Cullen
- Species: C. pallidum

Binomial name
- Cullen pallidum (N.T.Burb.) J.W.Grimes

= Cullen pallidum =

Species of plant

Cullen pallidum, the woolly scurf-pea, is a species of Cullen, a short-lived perennial herb, considered native and found in all states of mainland Australia. It is considered rare in Victoria and common in all other states. Its common names include: woolly scurf-pea, woolly psoralea, Bullamon lucerne, and white scurf-pea. Found primarily in habitats characterized by moving sand dunes, this species often has lower stems partially buried beneath the sand.

== Etymology and naming ==
Cullen named after the Scottish chemist and physician, William Cullen (1710–1790), was a lecturer on botany, among other subjects, at the University of Glasgow. Pallidum derived from the Latin word for pale, 'pallidus', makes reference to the plants pale purple flowers.

== Description ==
Cullen pallidum perennial herb that begins erect or ascending before becoming decumbent. Stems grow up to 90 cm (35 in) long, covered in grey-pubescent or villous hairs. Leaves are pinnately trifoliolate, 5 cm (2.0 in) long and 3.5 cm (1.4 in) wide, with ovate leaflets, featuring irregularly toothed margins, and few or obscure glands. Inflorescences are typically 2–8 cm (0.79–3.15 in) long with flowers arranged in groups of three along the rachis. C. pallidum is characterized by pea-shaped flowers that range in colour from pink-mauve to purple, or yellow. Each flower typically consists of 5 petals, with 2 petals often fused together. The flowers are arranged in oval to cylindrical racemes, which can contain upwards of 40 or more flowers per cluster. These racemes arise from the bases of the leaves on stalks, contributing to the plant's distinctive floral display and reproductive structure. Flowering mainly occurs in spring and summer, sometimes flowering the first year and arriving on an annual basis.

The fruit are 4 mm (0.16 in) long, dark, hairy pods with one seed inside. The singular seed is bean-shaped and brown in colour, with hair coverage ranging from dense to scattered.

The flowers of C. pallidum are notable for their dark lavender-purple petals, which bear resemblance to those of Cullen australasicum, albeit with a darker hue. This distinguishes them from the petals of Cullen patens.

== Distribution and status ==
Found primarily in habitats characterized by moving sand dunes, this species often has lower stems partially buried beneath the sand, although this does not reflect a specific growth habit. C. pallidum is listed as threatened and protected under Flora and Fauna Guarantee Act 1988 (FFG) and considered endangered in the Advisory List of Rare or Threatened Plants in Victoria, which states the species is at risk if current land uses and other factors continue to operate, of disappearing from the state.

== Seed collection and cultivation ==
Seeds can be collected during September to April, by running your hand along the spikes of the fruits when they are mature, fat pods turning black with a brown seed inside. Leave pods to dry for 1 to 2 weeks, then rub together to dislodge the seeds. This species has a period of physical dormancy, which can be overcome by nicking or soaking the seed coat to germinate the seed. Several case studies are testing the viability of using Cullen sp., including C. pallidum, as perennial pasture legumes for cropping in the low-rainfall wheatbelt of Western Australia due to their adaptiveness.
