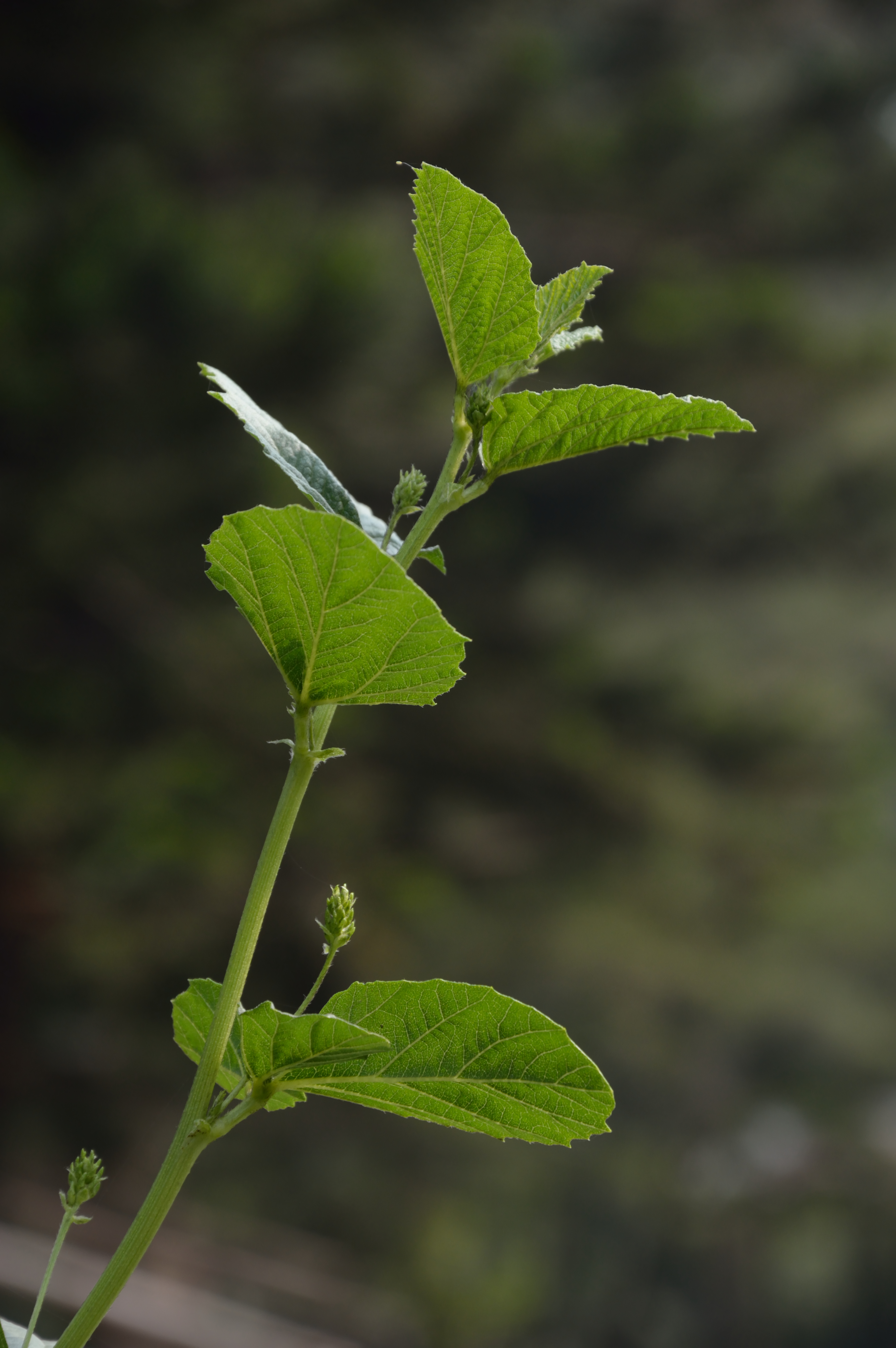

Scientific classification
- Kingdom: Plantae
- Clade: Tracheophytes
- Clade: Angiosperms
- Clade: Eudicots
- Clade: Rosids
- Order: Fabales
- Family: Fabaceae
- Subfamily: Faboideae
- Genus: Cullen
- Species: C. corylifolium

Binomial name
- Cullen corylifolium (L.) Medik.

Synonyms
- Bipontinia corylifolia (L.) Alef.; Dorychnium corylifolium (L.) Moench; Lotodes corylifolia (L.) Kuntze; Psoralea corylifolia L.; Psoralea patersoniae Schönland; Trifolium unifolium Forssk.

= Cullen corylifolium =

Species of legume

Cullen corylifolium, synonym Psoralea corylifolia, (babchi) is a plant used in Indian and Chinese traditional medicine. The seeds of this plant contain a variety of coumarins, including psoralen.

Used as a dietary supplement, Cullen corylifolium is of no clinical benefit and can cause potentially fatal herb-induced liver injury.

== Etymology ==
Corylifolium comes from similarity of the leaves to those of Corylus, a genus of tree in northern world regions, such as Sweden.

== Description ==
Cullen corylifolium grows 50–90 cm tall and is an annual plant. It has pale-purple flowers in short, condensed, axillary spikes. Its corolla is pale purple. Flowers one-seeded fruits. The most distinctive feature is the occurrence of minute brown glands which are immersed in surface tissue on all parts of the plant, giving it a distinctive and pleasant fragrance.

== Habitat and distribution ==
Cullen corylifolium is native to north-east tropical Africa, the southern Arabian Peninsula, and tropical and subtropical Asia, including India and Sri Lanka. It was occasionally cultivated in Arabia for its supposed medicinal properties.

== Chemical constituents ==
Cullen corylifolium extract contains numerous phytochemicals, including flavonoids (neobavaisoflavone, isobavachalcone, bavachalcone, bavachinin, bavachin, corylin, corylifol, corylifolin and 6-prenylnaringenin), coumarins (psoralidin, psoralen, isopsoralen and angelicin), meroterpenes (bakuchiol, and 3-hydroxybakuchiol).

== Use in traditional medicine ==
Cullen corylifolium (bu gu zhi 补骨脂 in traditional Chinese medicine) is an herb intended as a therapy for several disorders, such as attempted treatment of lichen planus by psoralen extract combined with sunlight exposure. Mostly as an oral formulation, it is also used in Ayurveda to treat skin disorders, such as psoriasis, vitiligo or leprosy.

There is no good clinical evidence that Cullen corylifolium supplements are effective as a therapy for any disorder.

Rather, supplements of Cullen corylifolium are hepatotoxic from its constituent chemicals causing cholestatic hepatitis. People with liver problems or certain other comorbidities are at risk of death from using Cullen corylifolium supplements.
