= Herb-induced liver injury =

Medical condition

Herb-induced liver injury (HILI) is a form of drug-induced liver injury caused by herbal medicines, typically herbal supplements or herb-based ethnomedicines.

== Prevalence ==
Herbs are a common component of ethnomedicines and their potential hepatotoxicity is a concern for people taking such medicines or other herbal supplements.

Use of such products is widespread within Ayurvedic medicine. Although injury from ayurvedic medicines has commonly been blamed on improper adulteration of drugs, a number of preparations can be harmful through direct effects purely because of their herbal ingredients.

== Implicated products ==
- Tinospora cordifolia supplement usage is of concern as the constituent chemicals cause hepatitis. Advocates of ayurveda have attempted to blame adulteration for these effects but investigation has shown the toxicity to result directly from the medicine itself. Supplement use can lead to death or the need for a liver transplant.
- Herbal supplements of Cullen corylifolium are hepatotoxic, as constituent chemicals cause cholestatic hepatitis. People with liver problems or certain other comorbidities are at risk of death from supplement use.
- Turmeric is promoted with numerous claims for health benefit, with little or no supporting evidence. Although of low bioavailability, some supplements boost potency via a variety of preparation techniques. Turmeric supplements are hepatotoxic, and have caused a recorded rise in incidence of liver injury. In Italy, the government has banned any claims of turmeric health benefits and mandated warning for turmeric-based supplements.
- Withania somnifera (ashwagandha) is promoted within ayurveda for numerous claimed benefits which medical science has been unable to confirm. Use of ashwagandha supplements is responsible for a global rise in herb-induced liver injury.

== See also ==
- Alternative medicine
