= Psoralidin =

Names
- Preferred IUPAC name 3,9-Dihydroxy-2-(3-methylbut-2-en-1-yl)-6H-[1]benzofuro[3,2-c][1]benzopyran-6-one
- Other names 3,9-Dihydroxy-2-prenylcoumestan

Identifiers
CAS Number	18642-23-4
3D model (JSmol)	Interactive image
ChEBI	CHEBI:8616
ChemSpider	4445118
ECHA InfoCard	100.208.688
PubChem CID	5281806
UNII	G16ZUQ069L
CompTox Dashboard (EPA)	DTXSID20171903
- InChI: InChI=1S/C20H16O5/c1-10(2)3-4-11-7-14-17(9-15(11)22)25-20(23)18-13-6-5-12(21)8-16(13)24-19(14)18/h3,5-9,21-22H,4H2,1-2H3 Key: YABIJLLNNFURIJ-UHFFFAOYSA-N; InChI=1/C20H16O5/c1-10(2)3-4-11-7-14-17(9-15(11)22)25-20(23)18-13-6-5-12(21)8-16(13)24-19(14)18/h3,5-9,21-22H,4H2,1-2H3 Key: YABIJLLNNFURIJ-UHFFFAOYAK
- SMILES: OC1=CC(O2)=C(C=C1)C3=C2C(C=C(C/C=C(C)/C)C(O)=C4)=C4OC3=O

Properties
Chemical formula	C_{20}H_{16}O_{5}
Molar mass	336.343 g·mol^{−1}
- Except where otherwise noted, data are given for materials in their standard state (at 25 °C [77 °F], 100 kPa). Infobox references

Psoralidin is a natural phenolic compound found in the seeds of Psoralea corylifolia.

== Chemical synthesis ==
Psoralidin production starts with a based catalyzed condensation between phenyl acetate and acid chloride. To form the ring of psoralidin, an intramolecular cyclization occurs, finished off by a microwave assisted cross metathesis reaction.

== Pharmacology ==
Psoralidin inhibits forskolin-induced corticotrophin releasing factor gene transcription. Recently, it has shown activity in vitro against gastric, colon, prostate, and breast cancer lines. It has the capability to inhibit protein tyrosine phosphatase 1B, a key metabolite involved in insulin signaling.

Psoralidin has shown positive results in the forced swim test, a mouse model of antidepressant activity. Psoralidin raised 5-hydroxytryptamine and 5-hydroxyindoleacetic acid levels in the brain. Dopamine levels changed as well as a result of psoralidin consumption. Stress hormones in mice such as serum corticotropin releasing factor, adrenal corticotropin releasing hormone, and corticosterone were reduced after psoralidin administration.

== Structure ==
Structurally, psoralidin is a coumestan derivative; it has an isopentenyl group at the second carbon position of coumestrol. Psoralidin is insoluble in water, making in vivo studies difficult.
