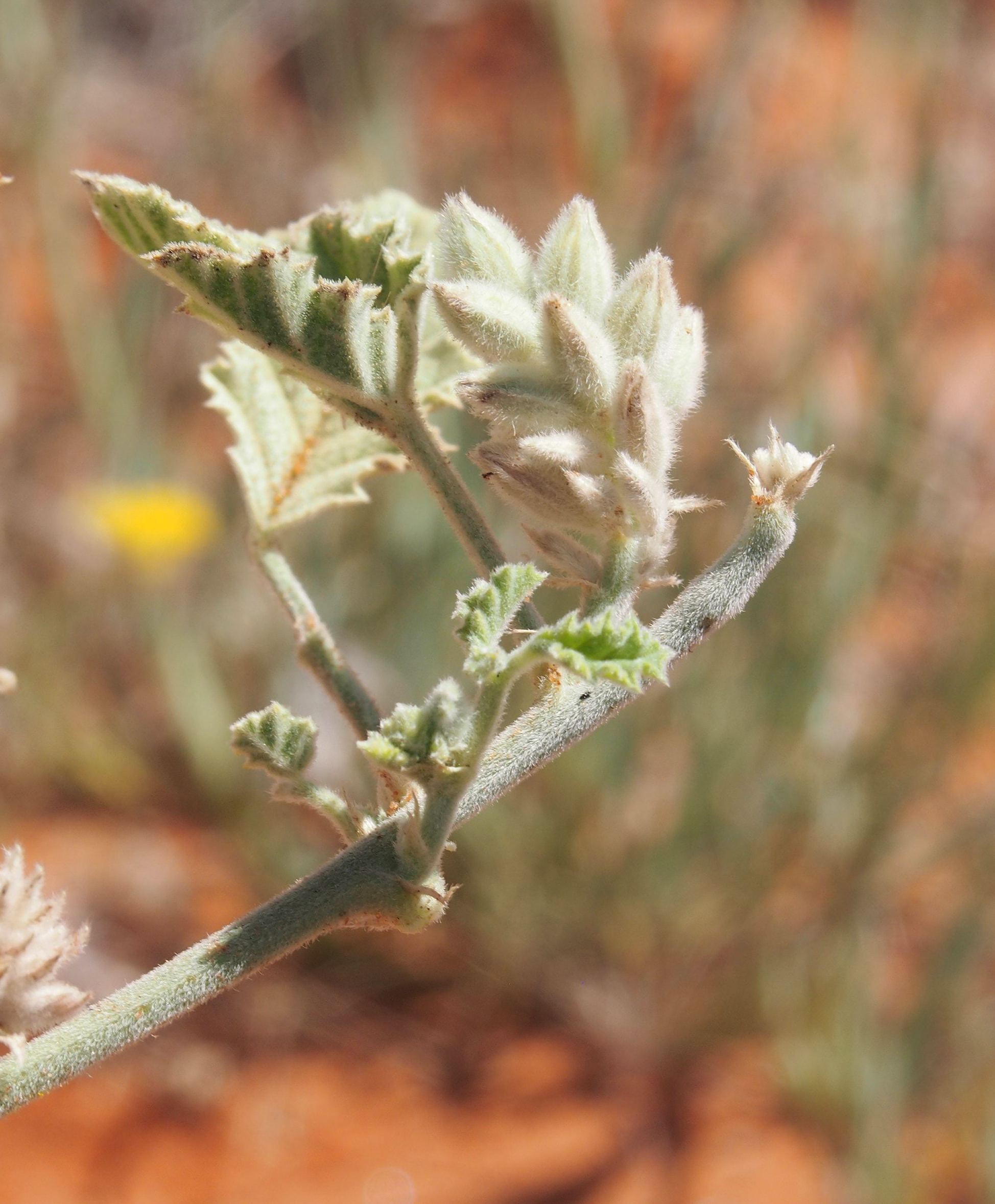

Scientific classification
- Kingdom: Plantae
- Clade: Tracheophytes
- Clade: Angiosperms
- Clade: Eudicots
- Clade: Rosids
- Order: Fabales
- Family: Fabaceae
- Subfamily: Faboideae
- Genus: Cullen
- Species: C. discolor

Binomial name
- Cullen discolor (Domin) J.W.Grimes

Synonyms
- Psoralea discolor Domin

= Cullen discolor =

Species of plant

Cullen discolor, commonly known as the grey scurf-pea, is a perennial herb or shrub to 1.5 metres high. Often found in sandy situations in semi arid Australia.
