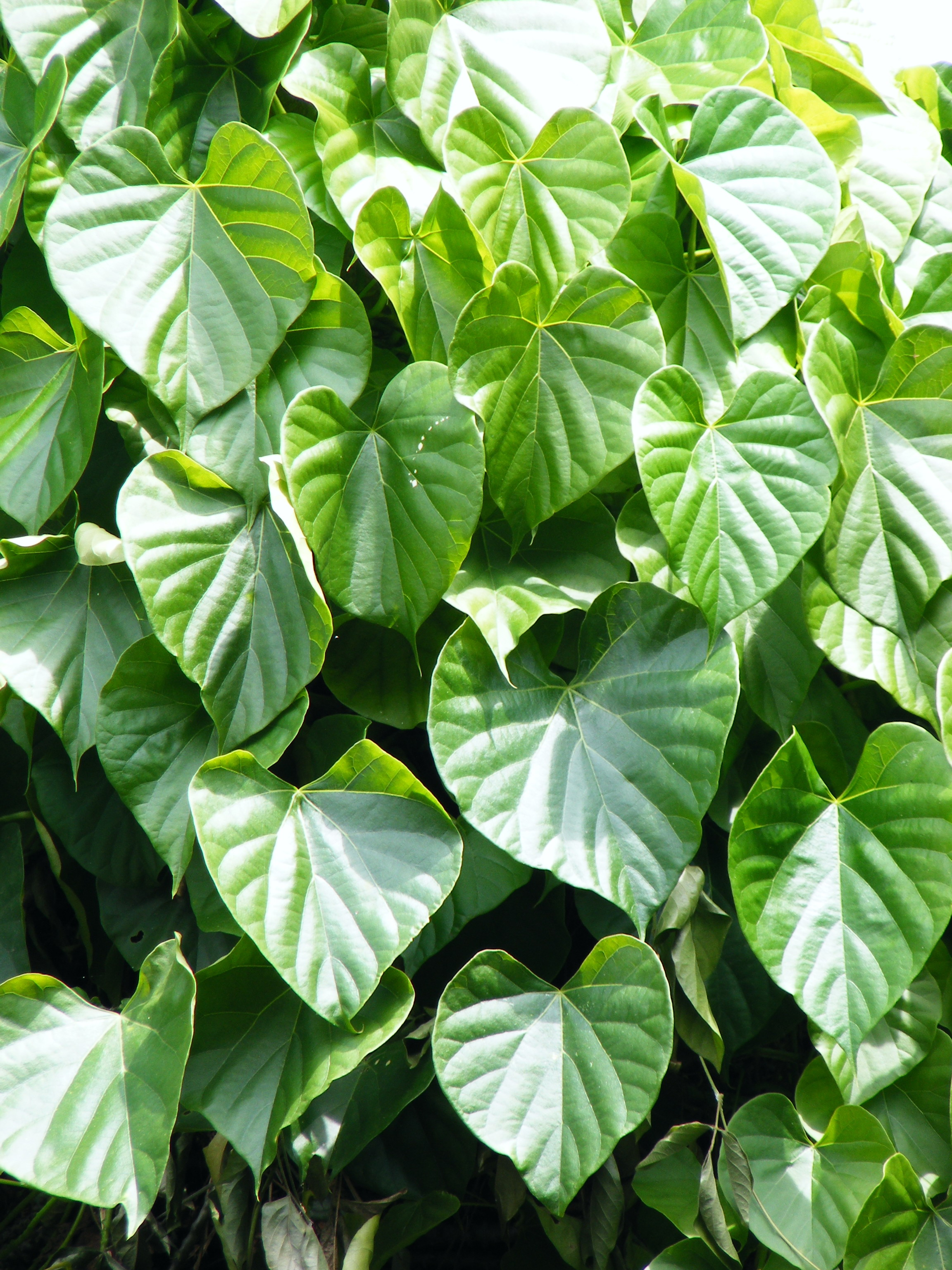

Scientific classification
- Kingdom: Plantae
- Clade: Tracheophytes
- Clade: Angiosperms
- Clade: Eudicots
- Order: Ranunculales
- Family: Menispermaceae
- Genus: Tinospora
- Species: T. cordifolia

Binomial name
- Tinospora cordifolia (Thunb.) Miers

= Tinospora cordifolia =

Species of flowering plant

Tinospora cordifolia, guruchi, guduchi, amrita, or the heart-leaved moonseed, is a herbaceous vine of the family Menispermaceae native to South and Southeast Asia. It has been used in Ayurveda in an attempt to treat various disorders.

There is no good evidence Tinospora cordifolia is of benefit as a medicine and its use can lead to potentially fatal herb-induced liver injury.

== Botanical description ==
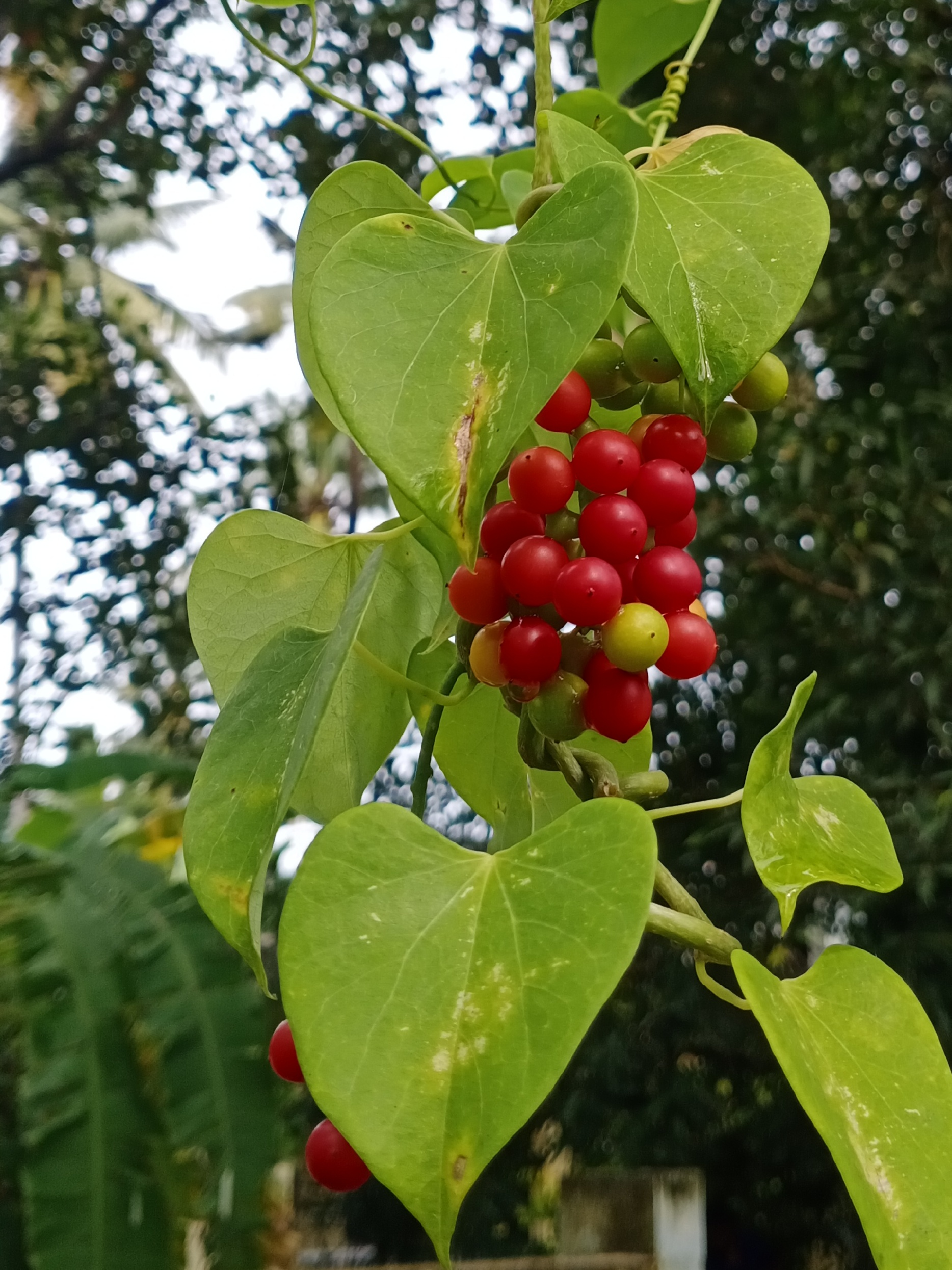
Fruits

It is a large, deciduous, extensively-spreading, climbing vine with several elongated twining branches. Leaves are simple, alternate, and exstipulate with long petioles up to 15 cm (6 in) long which are roundish and pulvinate, both at the base and apex with the basal one longer and twisted partially and half way around. It gets its name heart-leaved moonseed by its heart-shaped leaves and its reddish fruit. Lamina are broadly ovate or ovate cordate, 10–20 cm (4–8 in) long or 8–15 cm (3–6 in) broad, seven nerved and deeply cordate at base, membranous, pubescent above, whitish tomentose with a prominent reticulum beneath.

Flowers are unisexual, small on separate plants and appearing when the plant is leafless, greenish-yellow on axillary and terminal racemes. Male flowers are clustered, but female flowers are usually solitary. It has six sepals in two series of three each. The outer ones are smaller than the inner. It has six petals which are smaller than sepals, obovate, and membranous. Fruits aggregate in clusters of one to three. They are ovoid smooth drupelets on thick stalks with sub terminal style scars, scarlet or orange colored.

== Ecology ==
Endophytic fungi colonize the living, internal tissues of their host without causing any harmful effects. A recent study has shown that 29 endophytes belonging to different taxa were present in the samples collected from Tinospora cordifolia.

== Phytochemicals ==
Tinospora cordifolia contains diverse phytochemicals, including alkaloids, phytosterols, glycosides, tinosporide, and various other phytochemicals.

== Traditional medicine ==
Although used in Ayurveda over centuries in the belief that Tinospora has medicinal properties, there is no evidence from reviews of clinical research to indicate that it has any effect.

=== Toxicology ===
T. cordifolia supplement usage is the highest reported causative agent of herb-induced liver injury in India. Advocates of ayurveda have attempted to blame adulteration for these effects, but investigation showed the toxicity to result directly from compounds in the plant itself, such as furano-diterpenoids. Supplement use can lead to the need for a liver transplant or death from cirrhosis.

During the 2020–22 COVID-19 outbreak in India, the Ministry of AYUSH recommended use of T. cordifolia ("giloy") as a home remedy for immune support, but such a practice appeared to be associated with hepatitis cases among six people in Mumbai who used boiled or capsule preparations of the plant.
