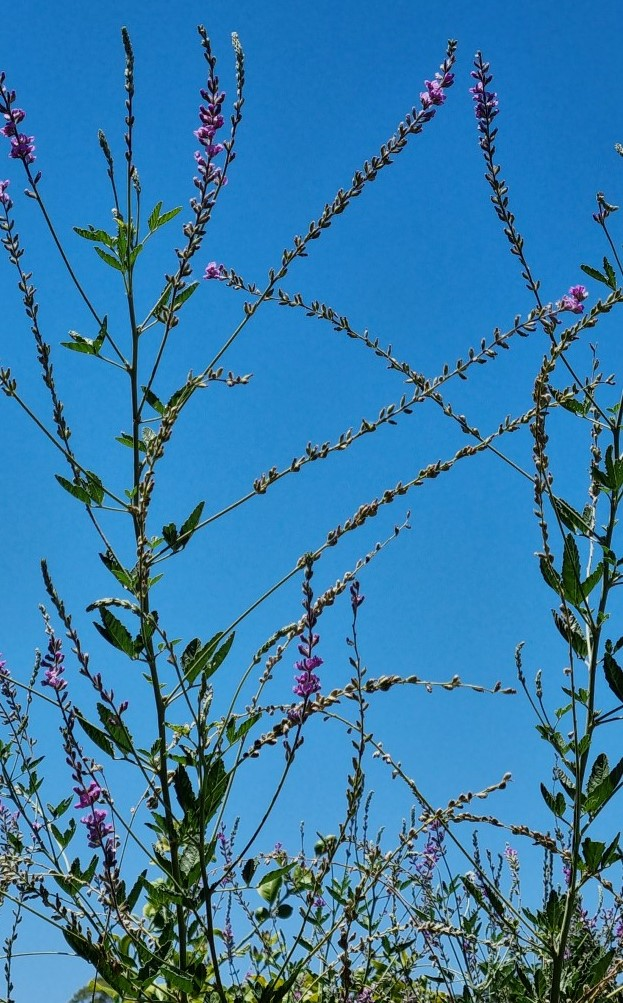

Scientific classification
- Kingdom: Plantae
- Clade: Tracheophytes
- Clade: Angiosperms
- Clade: Eudicots
- Clade: Rosids
- Order: Fabales
- Family: Fabaceae
- Subfamily: Faboideae
- Genus: Cullen
- Species: C. australasicum

Binomial name
- Cullen australasicum (Schltdl.) J.W.Grimes

Synonyms
- Psoralea australasica

= Cullen australasicum =

Species of plant

Cullen australasicum, commonly known as tall scurf-pea or native scurf pea is a herbaceous, perennial shrub that is native to Australia.

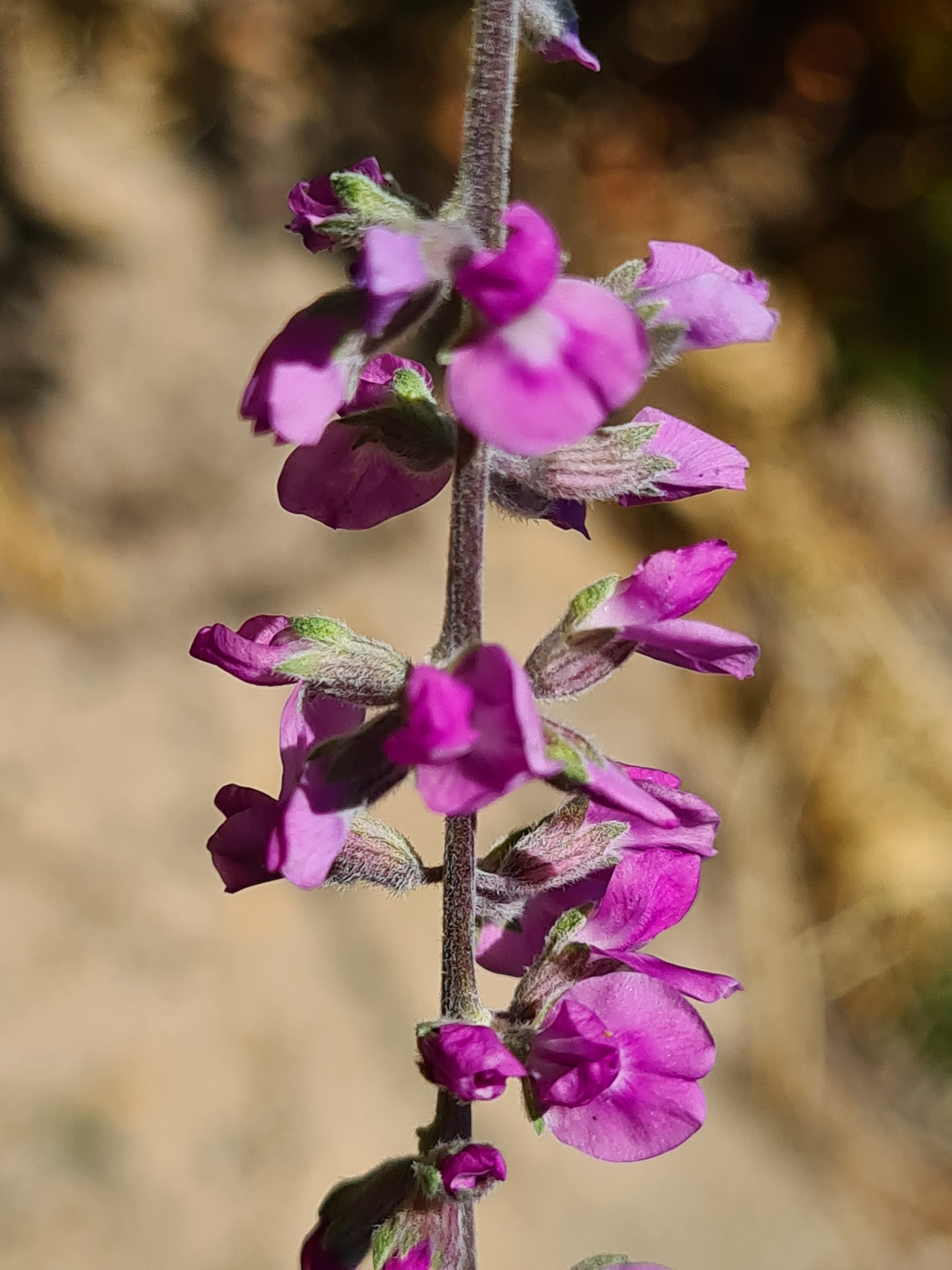
C. australasicum flowers

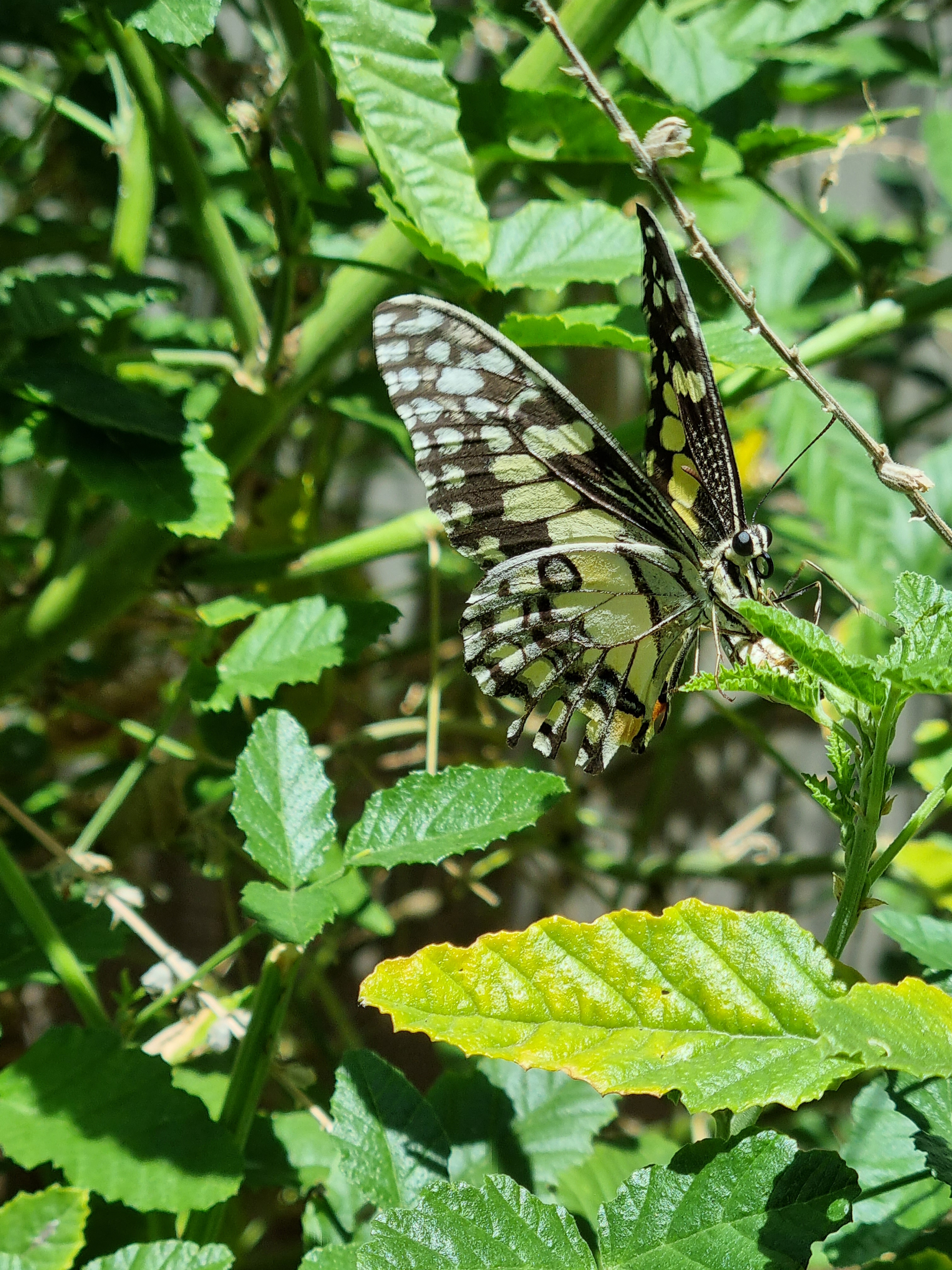
Chequered swallowtail butterfly laying eggs on Cullen australasicum

== Description ==
Cullen australasicum can grow to a height of 2.5 metres and a width up to 1.5 m. Stems can become woody at the base. The toothed rough leaves are trifoliate, with leaflets mostly 1-5cm long and 1-3cm wide. The small lilac pea-flowers are in groups of three, and held on long spikes well above the leaves. The seeds are light brown and egg-shaped.

== Distribution and habitat ==
It predominantly occurs in the arid zone of Australia in low rainfall environments, and can be found in all mainland states and territories. Favoured habitats include rocky gorges, woodland, grassland, dry creek lines and depressions. It is critically endangered in Victoria.

== Ecology ==
Cullen australasicum is a larval food plant of the Chequered swallowtail butterfly, Long-tailed Pea-blue, Common Grass-blue, Cotton Bollworm and Native Budworm. It is also a popular food of kangaroos.

== Cultivation ==
Some stockists in South Australia have Cullen australasicum available to buy for the home garden. Light pruning is recommended to maintain a compact form and to prevent the more common straggly appearance of naturally occurring plants. There are no cultivars currently available.
