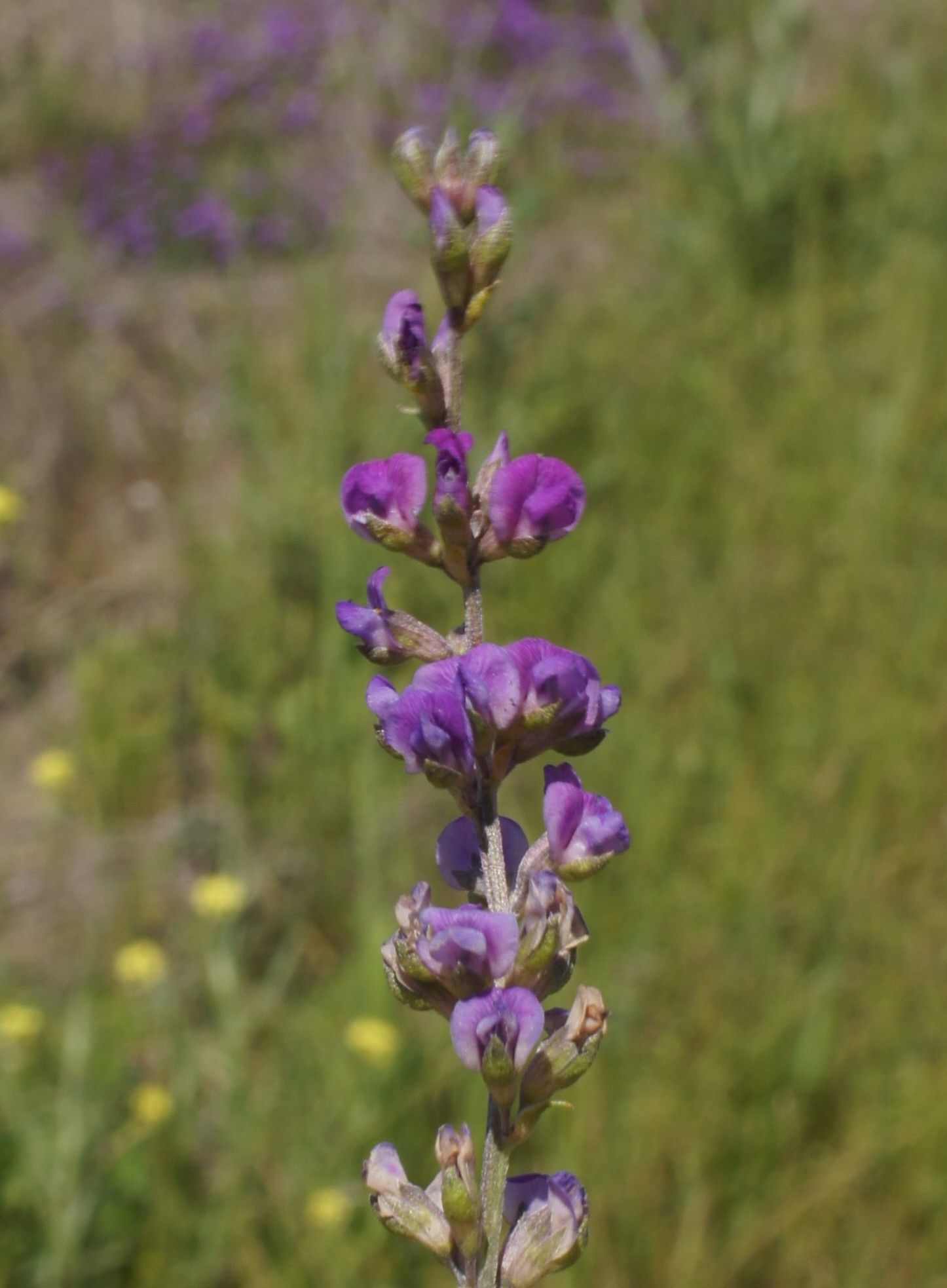

Scientific classification
- Kingdom: Plantae
- Clade: Tracheophytes
- Clade: Angiosperms
- Clade: Eudicots
- Clade: Rosids
- Order: Fabales
- Family: Fabaceae
- Subfamily: Faboideae
- Genus: Cullen
- Species: C. tenax

Binomial name
- Cullen tenax (Lindl.) J.W.Grimes

Synonyms
- Psoralea tenax Lindl.

= Cullen tenax =

Species of plant

Cullen tenax, commonly known as emu foot, is a herbaceous, perennial shrub. Often found in forest or on heavy soils in medium to low rainfall areas in south eastern Australia.

It was first described in 1838 as Psoralea tenax by John Lindley, but was reassigned to the genus Cullen in 1996 by James Walter Grimes.
