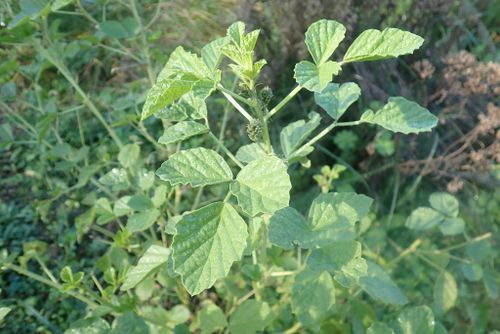

Conservation status
- Least Concern (IUCN 3.1)

Scientific classification
- Kingdom: Plantae
- Clade: Tracheophytes
- Clade: Angiosperms
- Clade: Eudicots
- Clade: Rosids
- Order: Fabales
- Family: Fabaceae
- Subfamily: Faboideae
- Genus: Cullen
- Species: C. americanum

Binomial name
- Cullen americanum (L.) Rydb.

Synonyms
- Psoralea americana L. Psoralea dentata DC. Lamottea polystachia (Poir.) Pomel; Lotodes americanum Kuntze; Munbya polystachia (Poir.) Pomel; Psoralea alnifolia Bertol. Psoralea americana var. polystachia (Poir.) Cout. Psoralea americana var. villosa Thell. Psoralea dentata var. polystachia (Poir.) DC. Psoralea lateralis Salisb. Psoralea polystachia Poir.

= Cullen americanum =

Species of plant

Cullen americanum is a plant in the Fabaceae family, found Northern Africa, Italy, Portugal, and Spain, and despite its species epithet, americanum, is an introduced species in the Americas.

It was first described in 1753 as Psoralea americana by Carl Linnaeus, but was reassigned to the genus Cullen in 1919 by Per Axel Rydberg.
