= Cullen virens =

Scientific classification
- Kingdom: Plantae
- Clade: Tracheophytes
- Clade: Angiosperms
- Clade: Eudicots
- Clade: Rosids
- Order: Fabales
- Family: Fabaceae
- Subfamily: Faboideae
- Genus: Cullen
- Species: C. virens

Binomial name
- Cullen virens (W.Fitzg.) J.W.Grimes

Synonyms
- Psoralea virens W.Fitzg.

Species of plant

Cullen virens is a plant in the Fabaceae family, found only in the north of Western Australia.

It is a slender, erect shrub, growing from 2 metres to 4 metres high on lateritic or basaltic soils. Its white and pinkish-purple flowers may be seen from May to October.

It was first described in 1918 as Psoralea virens by William Vincent Fitzgerald, but was reassigned to the genus Cullen in 1997 by James Walter Grimes.
