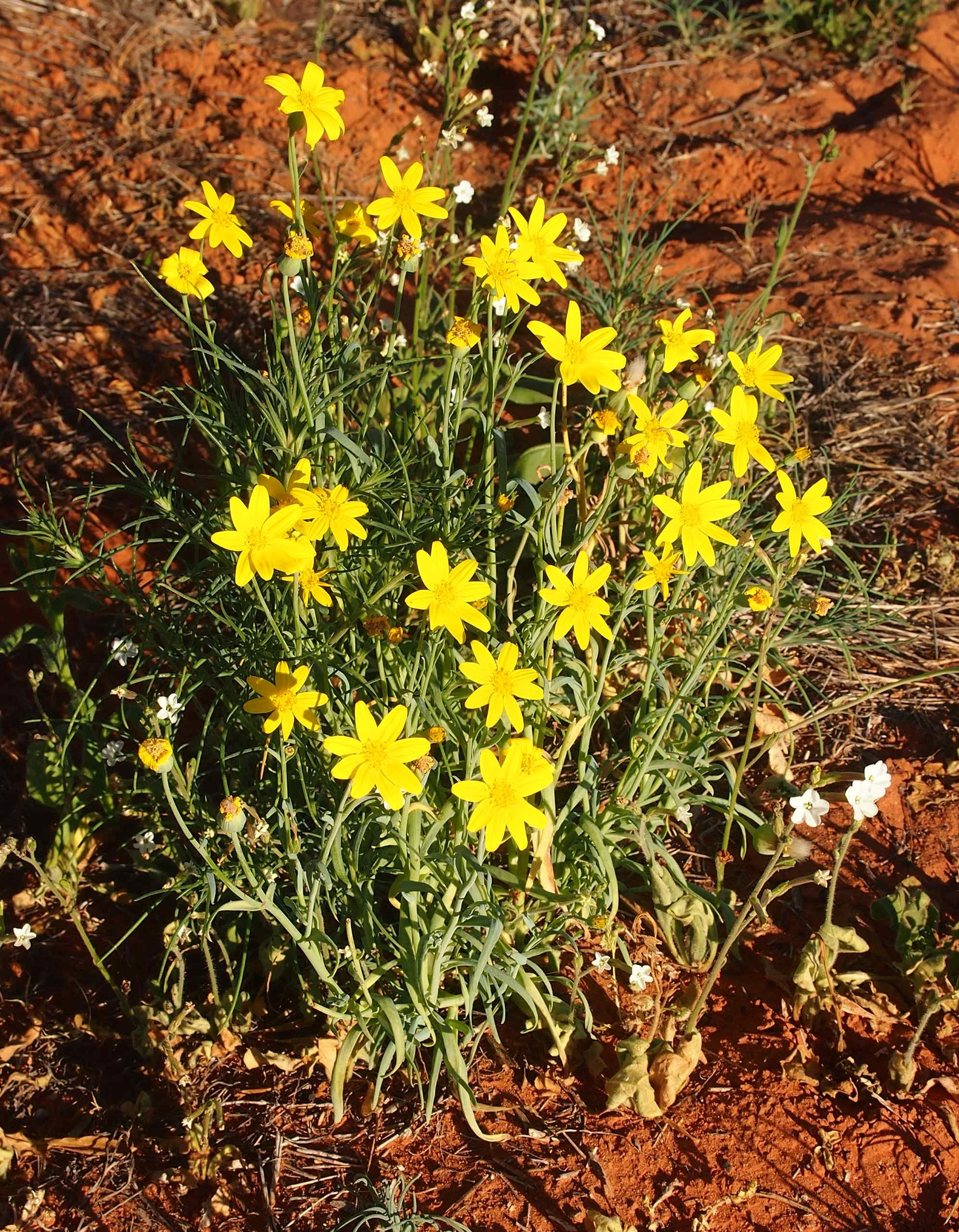

Scientific classification
- Kingdom: Plantae
- Clade: Tracheophytes
- Clade: Angiosperms
- Clade: Eudicots
- Clade: Asterids
- Order: Asterales
- Family: Asteraceae
- Genus: Senecio
- Species: S. gregorii

Binomial name
- Senecio gregorii F.Muell.

Synonyms
- Othonna gregorii (F.Muell.) C.Jeffrey

= Senecio gregorii =

Native Australian plant

Senecio gregorii, commonly known as annual yellowtop or fleshy groundsel, is a native Australian wildflower species, found in arid and semi-arid regions of the Australia and across the globe. It often grows prolifically after autumn/winter rains, showcasing stunning yellow flowers and fleshy foliage. The scientific name of this species was first published by Ferdinand von Mueller.

== Description ==
Senecio gregorii is an erect annual herb that ranges from 15 to 40 centimetres in height. Its stem is simple or branched, with leaves that are broad, linear and up to 9 centimetres long. The leaves can have a succulent appearance, although this varies among the species. It produces clusters of bright yellow flowers that appear from May through to October. Seeds are distributed by wind after the flower sets seed. S. gregorii reproduces sexually.

Senecio gregorii is distributed predominantly across arid to semi-arid inland Australia. It can tolerate unstable environments and desert-like conditions. It is found growing in a variety of soil types, ranging from white-grey clay to red sand, and has highly versatile habitat types, including clay pans, rocky outcrops and sand dunes

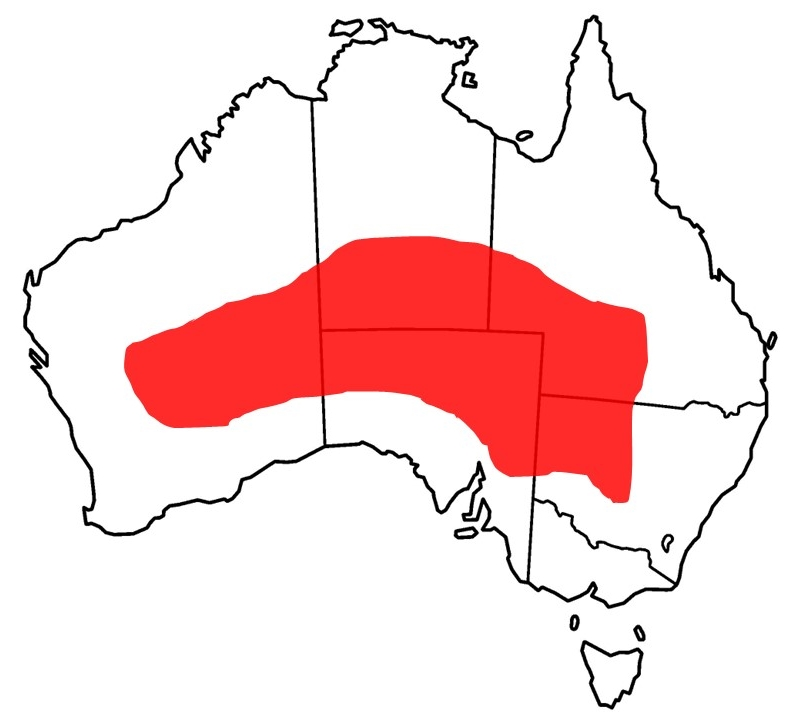
Distribution of S. gregorii in Australia

Using the IUCN Red List categories, S. gregorii has been classified as of "Least Concern" in Queensland and the Northern Territory. However, it is "Near Threatened" in Victoria. The conservation status of S. gregorii in other states of Australia has not been identified.

== Taxonomy ==
Senecio gregorii is part of the Senecio genus, which is one of the largest groups of flowering plants, containing over 1,250 species. This genus evolved during the mid to late Miocene period. The first publication of the species was documented by Ferdinand von Mueller. S. gregorii was transferred to the genus Othonna in 1986, but restored to Senecio in 2004.

== Ecology ==
Native bees (family: Halictidae) are key pollinators of S. gregorii plants, allowing both species to persist in their habitats. Some foraging vertebrate and invertebrate animal species rely on S. gregorii as a food source. For example, caterpillars of the moth Heliothis punctifera consume S. gregorii flowerheads before completing their development. Hence, the distribution and abundance of certain animal species depends upon the ecological patterns of S. gregorii.

However, S. gregorii contains pyrrolizidine alkaloids, which act as a defence mechanism against herbivores who have not developed a tolerance for the alkaloids. S. gregorii is also unpalatable for many animals.

== Evolutionary relationships ==
Adaptive radiation is rapid and common in Senecio species, such as S. gregorii. The adaptive diversification of this genus has driven its widespread geographical distribution. Different species (such as those listed above) exhibit unique phylogenetic and morphological characteristics (e.g. leaf shape), owing to the convergence and divergence of species from a common ancestor. Besides adaptive radiation, evidence of local adaptation, polyploidy and hybridisation has been recorded in Senecio species.

== Image gallery ==
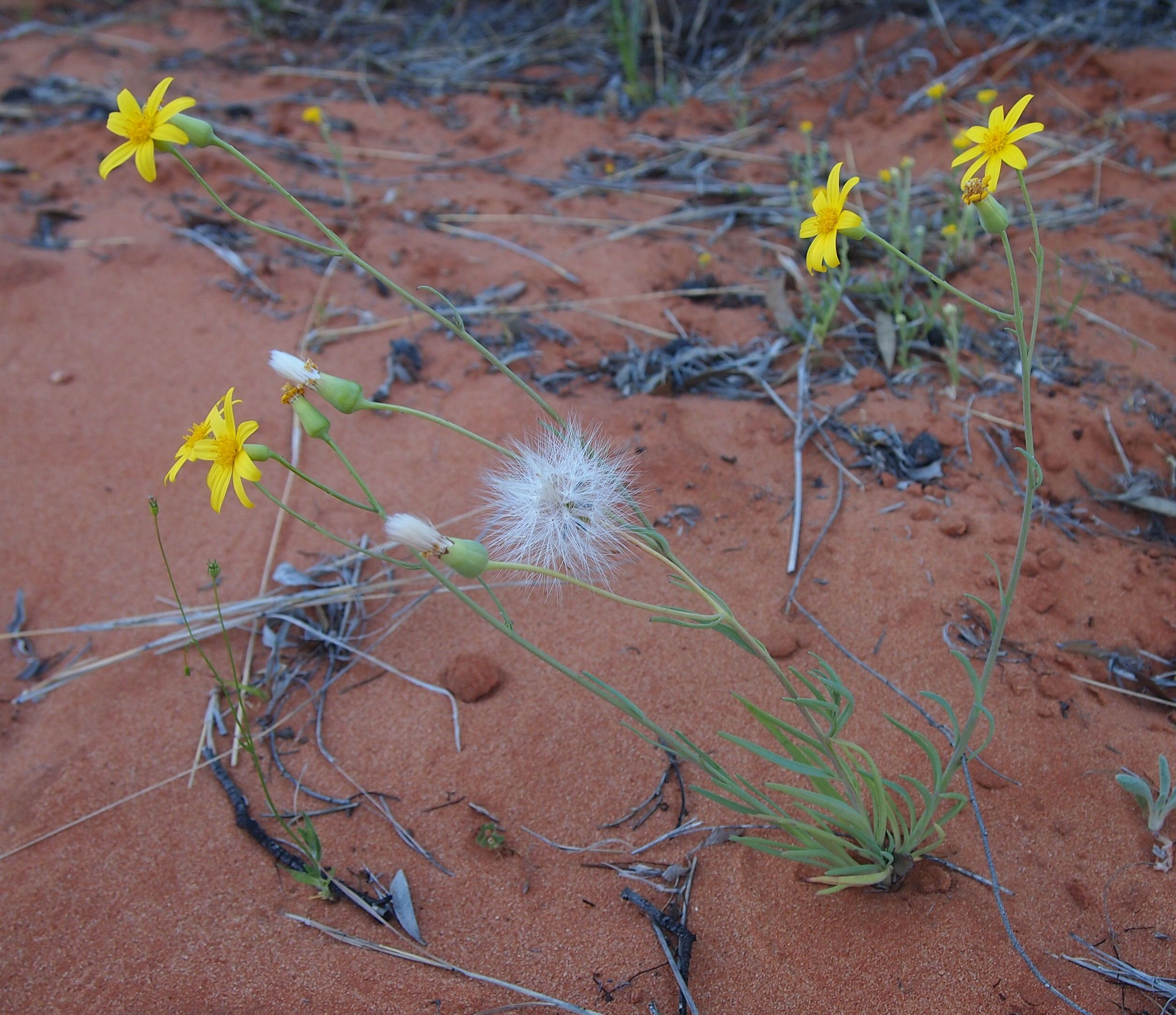
S. gregorii plant

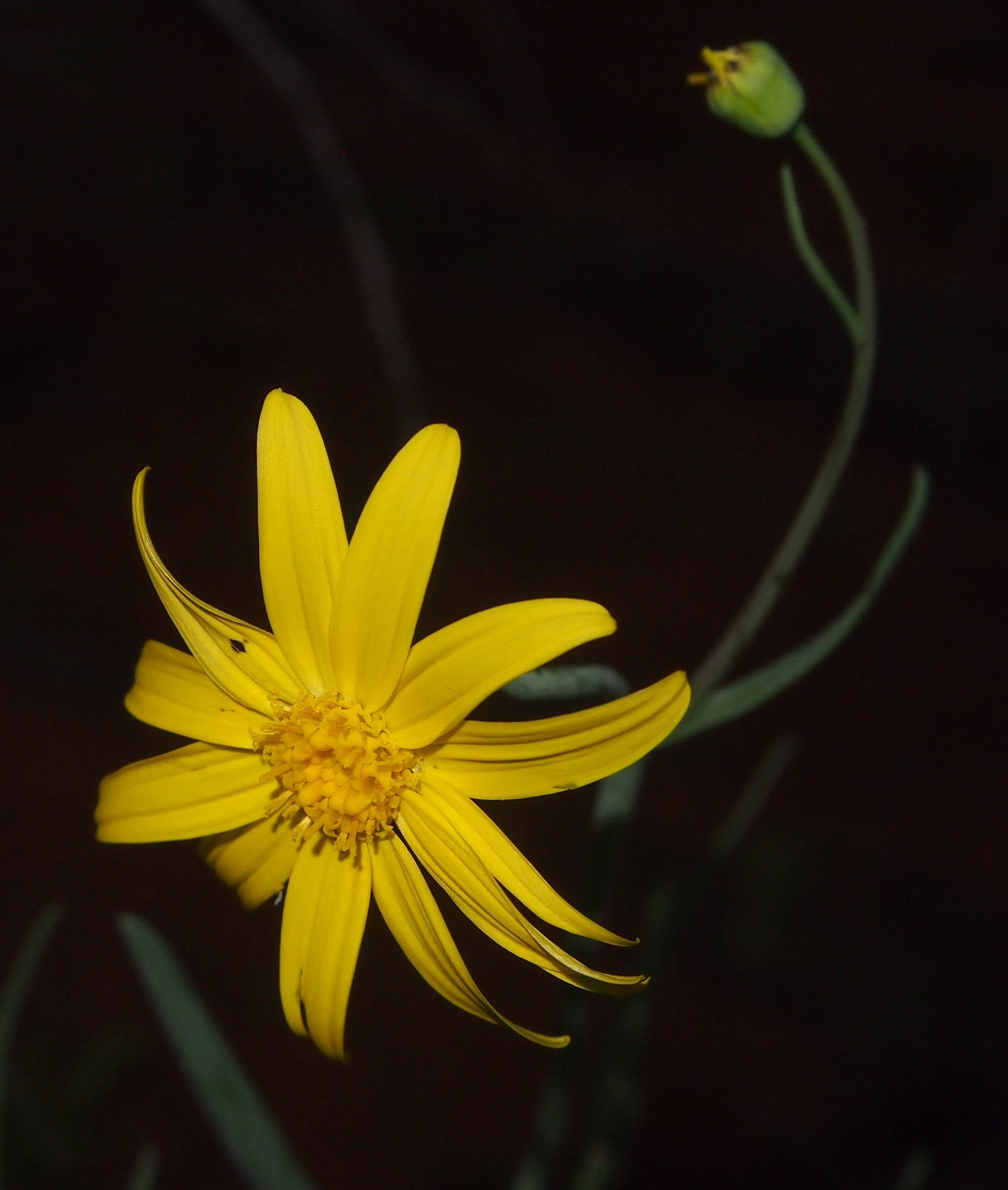
S. gregorii flower

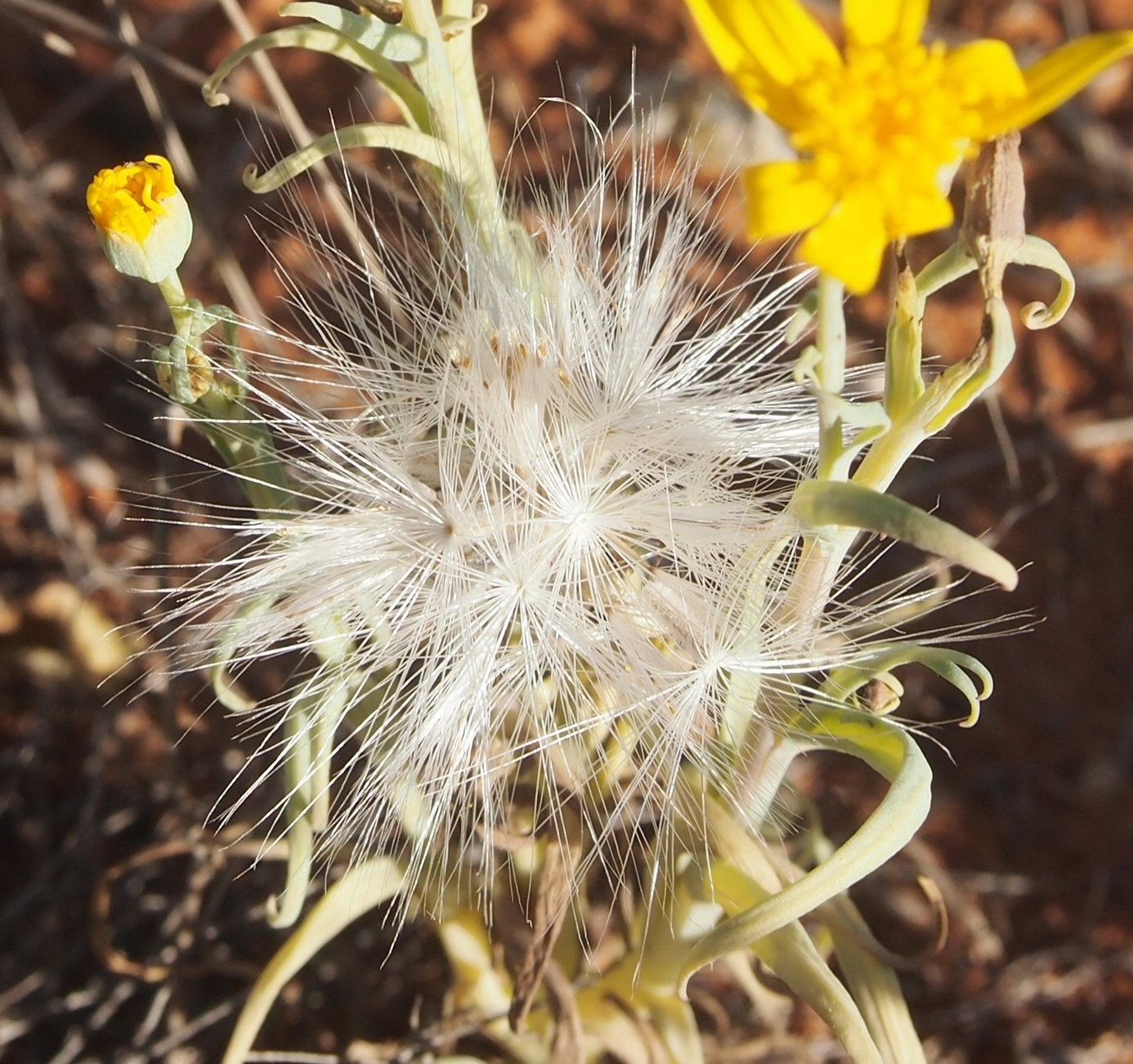
S. gregorii seeds

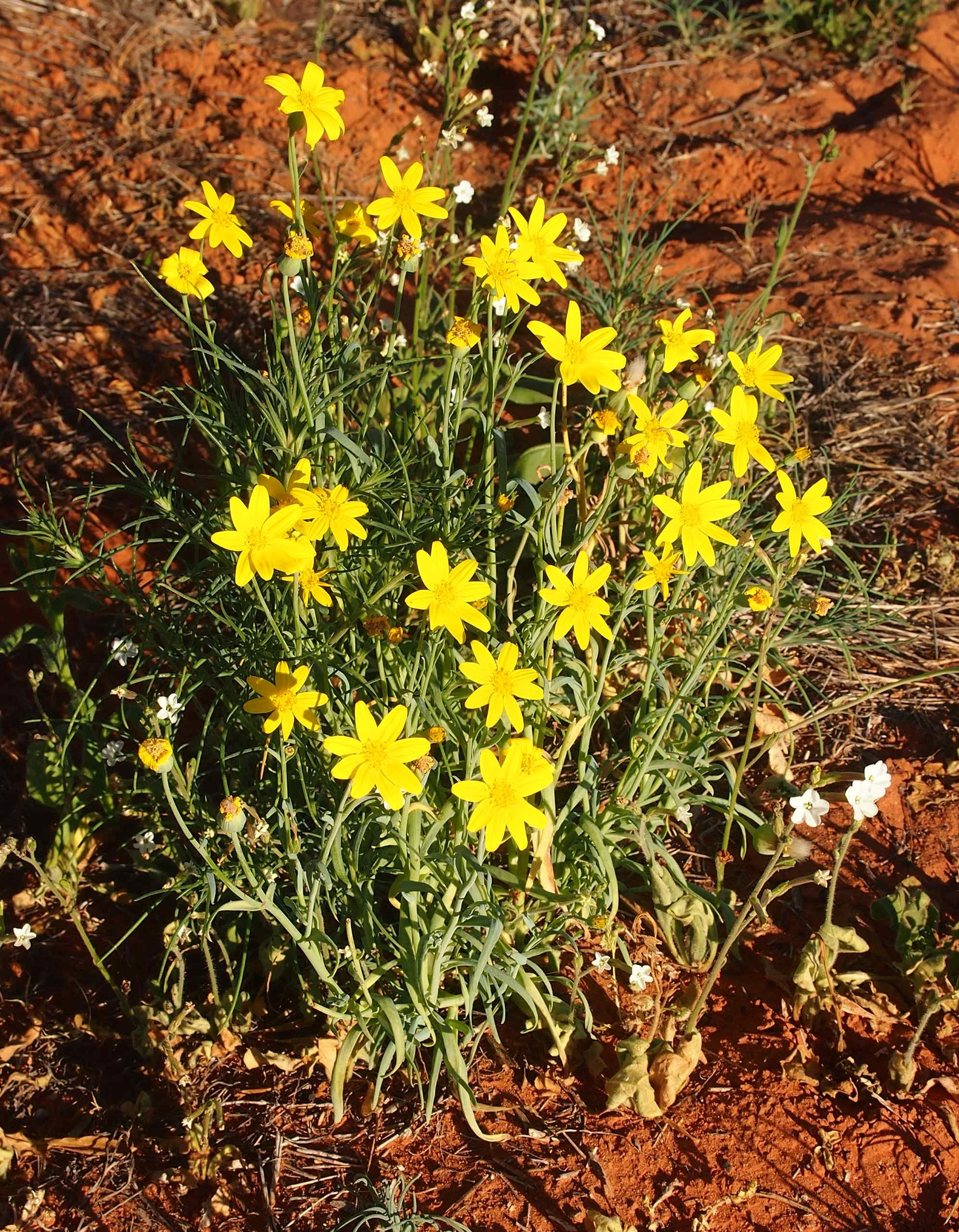
S. gregorii plant
