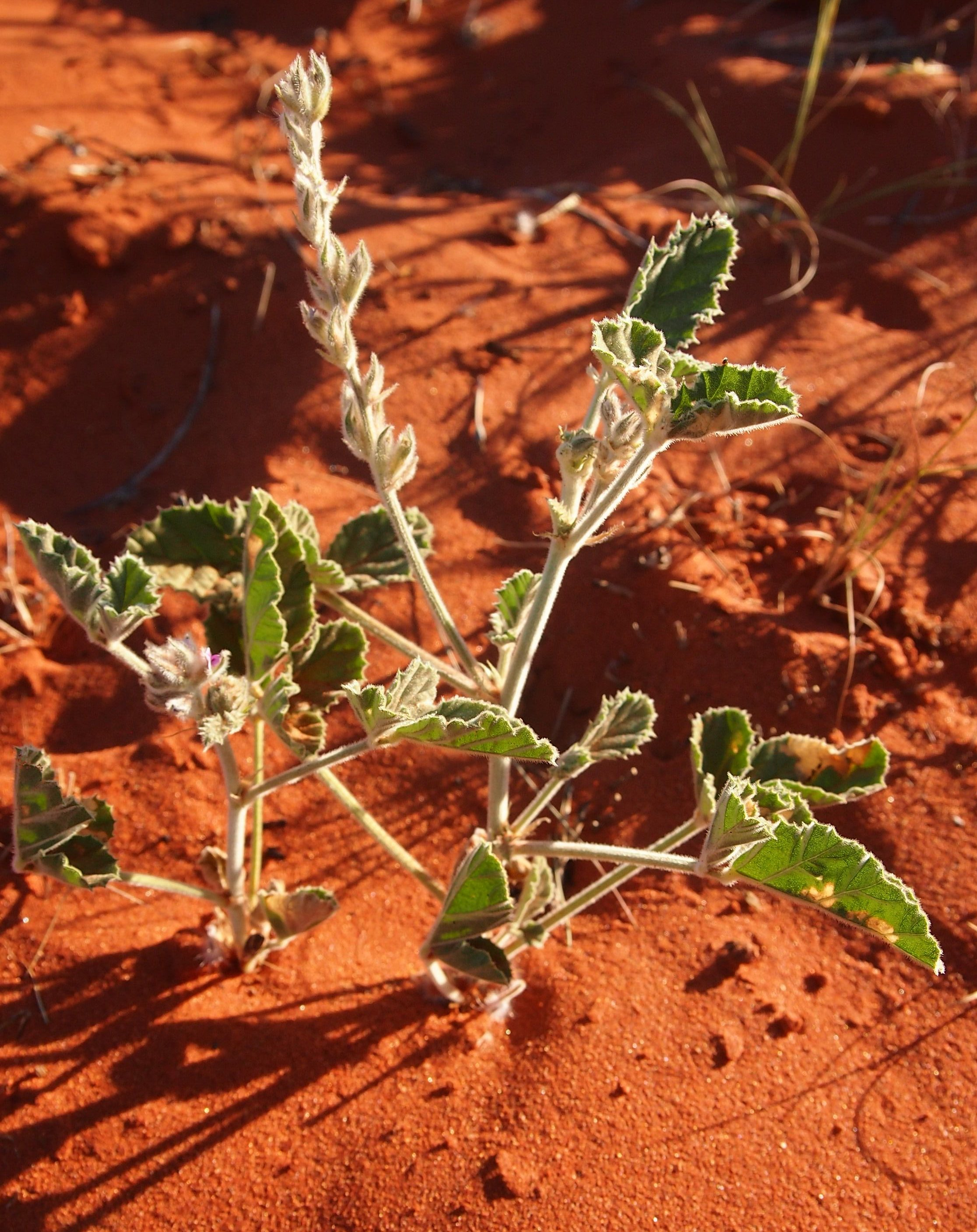
- Cullen pallidum

Scientific classification
- Kingdom: Plantae
- Clade: Tracheophytes
- Clade: Angiosperms
- Clade: Eudicots
- Clade: Rosids
- Order: Fabales
- Family: Fabaceae
- Subfamily: Faboideae
- Tribe: Psoraleeae
- Genus: Cullen; Medik.

Type species
- Cullen corylifolium (L.) Medik.

Synonyms
- Bauerella Schindl. 1926; Baueropsis Hutch. 1964; Meladenia Turcz. 1848

= Cullen (plant) =

Genus of legumes

Cullen is a genus of legumes (family Fabaceae) native to tropical, subtropical and arid regions of Africa, Asia and Australia. Despite the origin implied in the name of the constituent species Cullen americanum, legumes of this genus are not native to the Americas.

Cullen was previously included in broad definitions of the allied genus Psoralea.

== Species ==
As of April 2023, Plants of the World Online accepted the following species:

- Cullen americanum (L.) Rydb.
- Cullen australasicum (Schltdl.) J.W.Grimes
- Cullen badocanum (Blanco) Verdc.
- Cullen balsamicum (F.Muell.) J.W.Grimes
- Cullen biflorum (Kuntze) C.H.Stirt.
- Cullen candidum J.W.Grimes
- Cullen cinereum (Lindl.) J.W.Grimes
- Cullen corallum J.W.Grimes
- Cullen corylifolium (L.) Medik.
- Cullen cuneatum (W.Fitzg.) J.W.Grimes
- Cullen discolor (Domin) J.W.Grimes
- Cullen drupaceum (Bunge) C.H.Stirt.
- Cullen gaudichaudianum (Decne.) J.W.Grimes
- Cullen graveolens (Domin) J.W.Grimes
- Cullen jaubertianum (Fenzl) C.H.Stirt.
- Cullen lachnostachys (F.Muell.) J.W.Grimes
- Cullen leucanthum (F.Muell.) J.W.Grimes
- Cullen leucochaites J.W.Grimes
- Cullen martini (F.Muell.) J.W.Grimes
- Cullen microcephalum (Rchb. ex Kunze) J.W.Grimes
- Cullen pallidum (N.T.Burb.) J.W.Grimes
- Cullen parvum (F.Muell.) J.W.Grimes
- Cullen patens (Lindl.) J.W.Grimes
- Cullen plicatum (Delile) C.H.Stirt.
- Cullen plumosum J.W.Grimes
- Cullen pogonocarpum J.W.Grimes
- Cullen praeruptorum J.W.Grimes
- Cullen pustulatum (F.Muell.) J.W.Grimes
- Cullen spicigerum (Domin) A.E.Holland
- Cullen stipulaceum (Decne.) J.W.Grimes
- Cullen tenax (Lindl.) J.W.Grimes
- Cullen tomentosum (Thunb.) J.W.Grimes
- Cullen virens (W.Fitzg.) J.W.Grimes
- Cullen walkingtonii (F.Muell.) J.W.Grimes

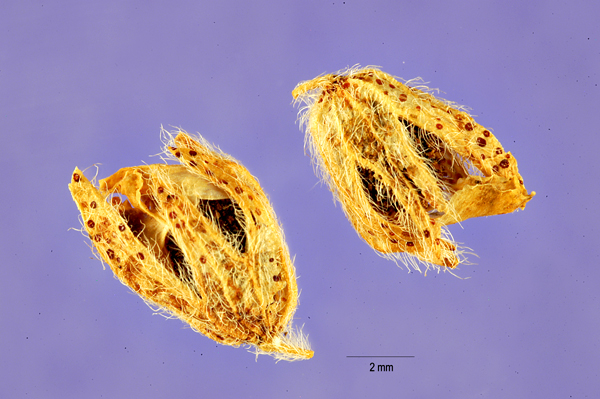
Cullen americana fruit
