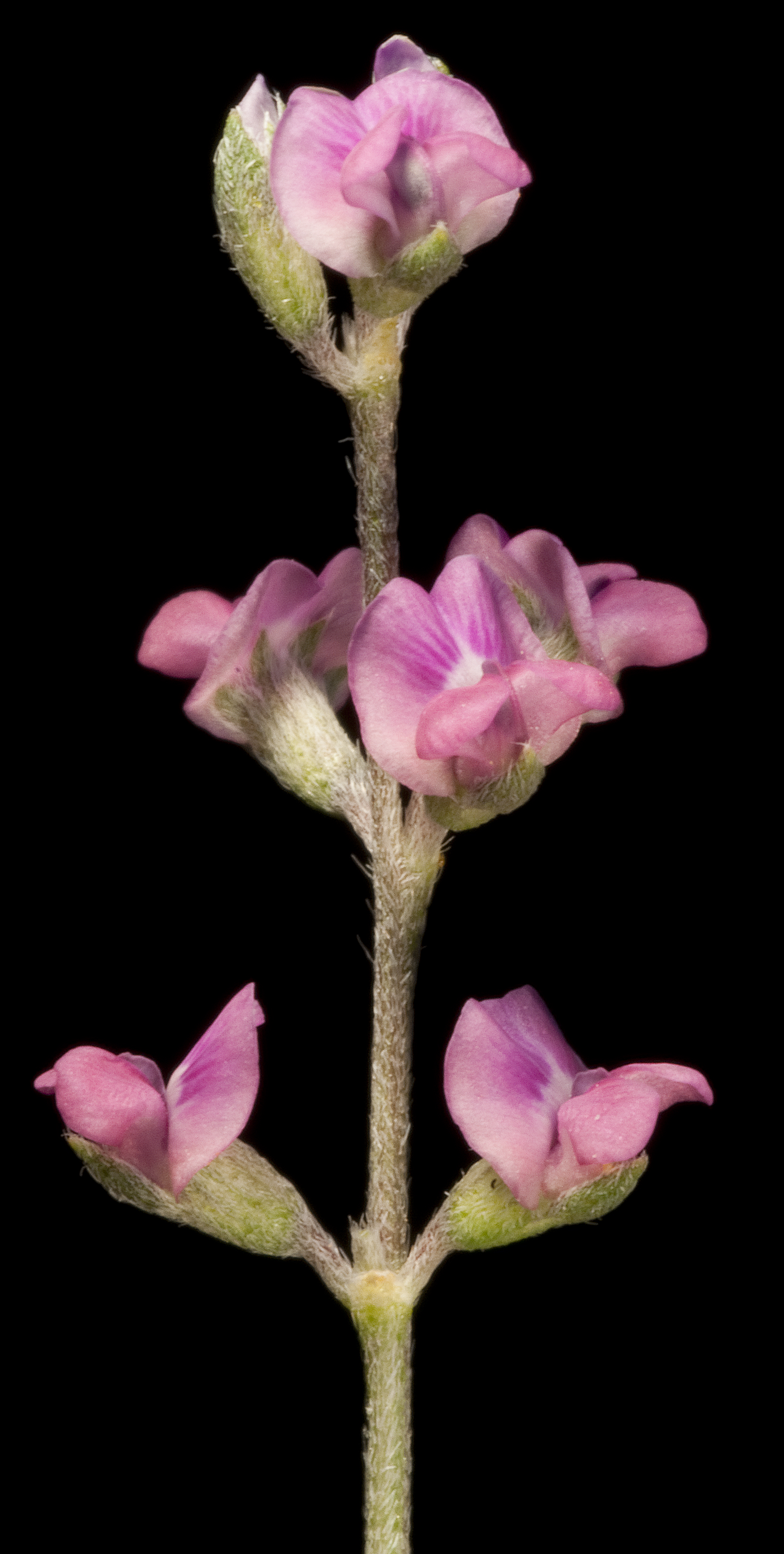

Scientific classification
- Kingdom: Plantae
- Clade: Tracheophytes
- Clade: Angiosperms
- Clade: Eudicots
- Clade: Rosids
- Order: Fabales
- Family: Fabaceae
- Subfamily: Faboideae
- Genus: Cullen
- Species: C. cinereum

Binomial name
- Cullen cinereum (Lindl.) J.W.Grimes

Synonyms
- Psoralea cinerea Lindl.

= Cullen cinereum =

Species of plant

Cullen cinereum, commonly known as the hoary scurf-pea, is a perennial herb or shrub to 1.5 metres high. Often found in moist situations in semi arid inland Australia.
