= Hedgehog pathway inhibitor =

Small molecules that inhibit the Hedgehog signaling pathway

Hedgehog pathway inhibitors, also sometimes called hedgehog inhibitors, are small molecules that inhibit the activity of a component of the Hedgehog signaling pathway. Due to the role of aberrant Hedgehog signaling in tumor progression and cancer stem cell maintenance across cancer types, inhibition of the Hedgehog signaling pathway can be a useful strategy for restricting tumor growth and for preventing the recurrence of the disease post-surgery, post-radiotherapy, or post-chemotherapy. Thus, Hedgehog pathway inhibitors are an important class of anti-cancer drugs. At least three Hedgehog pathway inhibitors have been approved by the Food and Drug Administration (FDA) for cancer treatment. These include vismodegib and sonidegib, both inhibitors of Smoothened (SMO), which are being used for the treatment of basal cell carcinoma. Arsenic trioxide, an inhibitor of GLI transcription factors, is being used for the treatment of acute promyelocytic leukemia. In addition, multiple other Hedgehog pathway inhibitors are in different phases of clinical trials.

== Overview of the Hedgehog signaling pathway ==
The classical Hedgehog signaling pathway involves glycoproteins that are secreted by cells into the intercellular space. Multiple such glycoproteins have been characterized: Sonic Hedgehog (Shh), Indian Hedgehog (Ihh), and Desert Hedgehog (Dhh). Among these, Shh is the most potent. It binds and inactivates the transmembrane protein Patched1 (PTCH1). In the absence of Shh, PTCH1 inhibits the activity of Smoothened (SMO), another transmembrane protein. Upon the inactivation of PTCH1 by Shh, glioma-associated (GLI) transcription factors enter the nucleus and activate the expression of multiple genes including Myc, Bcl-2, NANOG, and SOX2. Targets of GLIs include genes involved in cell proliferation, apoptosis, angiogenesis, epithelial-mesenchymal transition, and self-renewal of stem cells.

In addition to the canonical pathway described above, some alternate pathways related to Shh signaling have also been reported. One example is the activation of SMO without the subsequent entry of GLI transcription factors into the nucleus. Another, better characterized pathway is the activation of GLIs independent of Shh or PTCH1 / SMO. This alternate mode of triggering the activity of GLIs is common in cancer cells. Oncogenes such as KRAS can activate the GLIs in the absence of Shh signaling. Transcriptional activity of GLIs is also upregulated upon the knockdown of p53, a tumor-suppressor gene often lost during cancer progression.

== Role of Hedgehog signaling in cancer ==
As mentioned above, targets of the Hedgehog signaling pathway include genes involved in cell proliferation, apoptosis, angiogenesis, epithelial-mesenchymal transition, and self-renewal of stem cells. Dysregulation of all these cellular processes has been reported across cancer types. Abnormal control of these processes in cancer cells is often a consequence of dysregulated Shh signaling.

The first major breakthrough in understanding the role of Shh signaling in cancer progression was the discovery that mutations in the PTCH1 gene, which codes for the PTCH1 protein, were responsible for Gorlin syndrome. Gorlin syndrome is an autosomal dominant disorder characterized by developmental abnormalities and increased risk of developing basal cell carcinoma or medulloblastoma. Mutations in the PTCH1 gene can lead to the abnormal activation of GLI transcriptional activity which in turn promotes tumor development and progression. Overexpression of Shh ligand has been reported in multiple cancer types including pancreatic, colorectal, prostate, and gliomas. This can lead to the activation of GLI transcriptional activity in the cell over-secreting Shh (autocrine signaling) or in neighboring cells (paracrine signaling). Further, Shh ligands can stimulate the production of growth factors by stromal cells present in the tumor microenvironment. These growth factors, in turn, promote the growth, survival, and proliferation of cancer cells.

Aberrant Shh signaling has also been implicated in the maintenance of cancer stem cells (CSCs). In chronic myeloid leukemia and breast cancer, inhibition of Shh signaling has been shown to reduce stem cell propagation and renewal. In pancreatic and colorectal cancer, Shh signaling in CSCs drives epithelial-mesenchymal transition and, ultimately, cancer metastasis. CSCs exhibit increased potential for self-renewal, differentiation, and for starting secondary tumors at distant organ sites. CSCs also exhibit mechanisms that drive resistance to chemotherapies and radiotherapy. As a result, while chemotherapy and radiotherapy are often successful in eliminating the bulk of the tumor (which consists of non-CSCs), CSCs that are left behind can lead to tumor recurrence. Thus, via its role in CSC maintenance, Shh signaling contributes towards the failure of anti-cancer therapies.

== Mechanism of action ==
Given the role of Shh signaling in promoting tumor progression and in the failure of anti-cancer therapies, the Hedgehog signaling pathway is an important therapeutic target for restricting tumor progression and to prevent disease recurrence post-treatment. Different parts of the Hedgehog signaling pathway may be targeted to abrogate the activation of pathways that promote tumor progression.

=== SMO Inhibitors ===
Inhibition of the transmembrane protein Smoothened (SMO) prevents the induction of GLI transcriptional activity upon exposure of cancer cells to Shh ligands. Loss of induction of GLIs upon activation of Shh signaling inhibits the ability of Shh signaling to promote tumor progression and cancer stem cell maintenance. Therefore, SMO has been a primary target in the development of Hedgehog pathway inhibitors. Two such inhibitors, Sonidegib and Vismodegib have been approved by the Food and Drug Administration (FDA) for treating basal cell carcinoma. Multiple other SMO inhibitors are in active clinical trials.

==== GDC-0449 (vismodegib / Erivedge) ====
Vismodegib was created by Roche / Genentech / Curis. It directly binds to SMO, preventing GLI activation. In January 2012, it became the first Hedgehog pathway inhibitor to be approved by the FDA for the treatment of any cancer. Vismodegib is currently used for the treatment of metastatic basal cell carcinoma (BCC) in adults. It is also used for treating patients with locally advanced BCC who are not candidates for surgery or radiation therapy. However, it has been shown that cancer cells in BCC patients can develop resistance to vismodegib via mutations in the SMO protein which prevents the binding of the drug to SMO. Effectiveness of vismodegib as a monotherapy and in combination with other chemotherapies is currently being tested in multiple clinical trials across cancer types, including medulloblastoma, small cell lung cancer, pancreatic cancer, intracranial meningioma, recurrent glioblastoma, and acute myeloid leukemia.

==== LDE-225 (erismodegib / sonidegib / Odomzo) ====
Sonidegib was created by Novartis. It is a SMO antagonist that can induce arrest of cell division and promote apoptosis in cancer cells. Sonidegib has been effective in limiting the invasive potential of multiple cancer types including glioblastoma, prostate cancer, and renal cell carcinoma. It received FDA approval in July 2015 and is being used for the treatment of BCC that has recurred post-surgery or post-radiation therapy. Sonidegib can also be used in BCC patients who are not candidates for surgery or radiation therapy. Effectiveness of this drug in other cancer types including hematological malignancies is currently being tested in multiple clinical trials.

Other SMO inhibitors currently under clinical trial include IPI-926 (saridegib), BMS-833923 / XL139 (developed by Bristol-Myers Squibb / Exelexis), PF-04449913 (glasdegib; developed by Pfizer), and LY2940680 (taladegib; developed by Eli Lilly and Company).

=== GLI inhibitors ===
GLI transcription factors are the terminal effectors of the Hedgehog signaling pathway. Thus, inhibition of GLIs abrogates the ability of Hedgehog signaling to trigger processes that contribute towards tumor progression and recurrence. Since the transcriptional activity of GLIs can be activated via alternate pathways, independent of SMO, GLIs are an important therapeutic target in the development of Hedgehog pathway inhibitors for cancer treatment.

==== GANTs ====
GANTs, or GLI inhibitors, were discovered at the National Cancer Institute. GANT-58 and GANT-61 have both been shown to inhibit the GLI-mediated activation of genes. GANT-61 effectively reduced the DNA-binding affinity of GLI1 and GLI2 in multiple cancer cell lines, including rhabdomyosarcoma, osteosarcoma, neuroblastoma, and ovarian cancer.

==== Arsenic trioxide (ATO) ====
Arsenic Trioxide (ATO) directly binds to GLI1 and GLI2 and inhibits the expression of target genes of the Hedgehog signaling pathway, thereby promoting cancer cell apoptosis and reducing cancer cell growth. ATO has been approved by the FDA for the treatment of acute promyelocytic leukemia. Further, it has been shown to be effective in restricting the growth of malignant pleural mesothelioma, malignant rhabdosarcoma, prostate cancer, and colon cancer cell lines. ATO has also been shown to inhibit cancer stem cell maintenance in pancreatic cancer. Several clinical trials, ranging from Phase I to Phase IV, are currently underway to test the effectiveness of ATO in both solid tumors and hematological malignancies.

=== Shh inhibitors ===
Sonic Hedgehog (Shh) is the most potent of the three Hedgehog ligands. Inhibition of Shh expression and activity can thus be an effective way of restricting Hedgehog signaling-mediated tumor progression. RU-SKI 43 inhibits the activity of SHHat, an enzyme that catalyzes the palmitoylation of Shh. Since palmitoylation is essential for the activity of Shh, inhibition of SHHat by RU-SKI 43 inhibits Shh signaling in cancer cells. 5E1, a monoclonal antibody against Shh, has been shown to inhibit medulloblastoma growth in mouse models. 5E1 also restricts the proliferation of pancreatic cancer cells in mice. While shown to be effective in the lab, both these Shh inhibitors are yet to make their way to human trials.
