= SANT-2 =

Inhibitor of Sonic hedgehog (Shh) signaling

Identifiers
- IUPAC name: N-[3-(1H-benzimidazol-2-yl)-4-chlorophenyl]-3,4,5-triethoxybenzamide
- CAS Number: 329196-48-7
- PubChem CID: 1367095
- IUPHAR/BPS: 10331
- ChemSpider: 1144264
- ChEMBL: ChEMBL514344
- CompTox Dashboard (EPA): DTXSID40362255

Chemical and physical data
- Formula: C_{26}H_{26}ClN_{3}O_{4}
- Molar mass: 479.96 g·mol^{−1}
- 3D model (JSmol): Interactive image
- SMILES: CCOC1=CC(=CC(=C1OCC)OCC)C(=O)NC2=CC(=C(C=C2)Cl)C3=NC4=CC=CC=C4N3
- InChI: InChI=1S/C26H26ClN3O4/c1-4-32-22-13-16(14-23(33-5-2)24(22)34-6-3)26(31)28-17-11-12-19(27)18(15-17)25-29-20-9-7-8-10-21(20)30-25/h7-15H,4-6H2,1-3H3,(H,28,31)(H,29,30); Key:VQOJFGFKIVFMDH-UHFFFAOYSA-N

SANT-2 is a small-molecule antagonist of the sonic hedgehog (Shh) pathway, a developmental signaling cascade implicated in tissue patterning, stem cell maintenance, and the progression of various cancers. By targeting the smoothened (SMO) receptor, SANT-2 disrupts aberrant Shh pathway activation, thereby inhibiting downstream transcriptional programs that drive uncontrolled cell proliferation and survival. Due to its potency and specificity, SANT-2 has become a tool for studying Hedgehog-dependent oncogenesis and holds potential as a lead compound for the development of targeted anticancer therapeutics.

== Pharmacology ==
SANT-2 is a potent antagonist of the Smoothened (SMO) receptor, a key component of the Sonic hedgehog (Shh) signaling pathway, displaying a dissociation constant (K_{D}) of 12 nM for SMO binding. Its pharmacological profile is characterized by strong allosteric binding—similar to the first-in-class SMO antagonist SANT-1, interfering with the receptor’s activity even in the presence of endogenous and synthetic agonists. SANT-2 efficiently displaces radiolabeled SAG-1.3 and cyclopamine bound to SMO, with inhibition constants (K_{d}) of 7.8 nM and 8.4 nM, respectively, highlighting its high affinity and specificity for this receptor.

== Synthesis ==
SANT-2 is synthesized by coupling 2-chloro-5-nitrobenzoic acid with o-phenylenediamine to form a benzimidazole intermediate. Béchamp reduction of the nitro group affords the corresponding aniline, which is then coupled with 3,4,5-triethoxybenzoic acid via amide formation to yield SANT-2.
