= Philip A. Beachy =

Canadian biologist (born 1958)

Philip Beachy
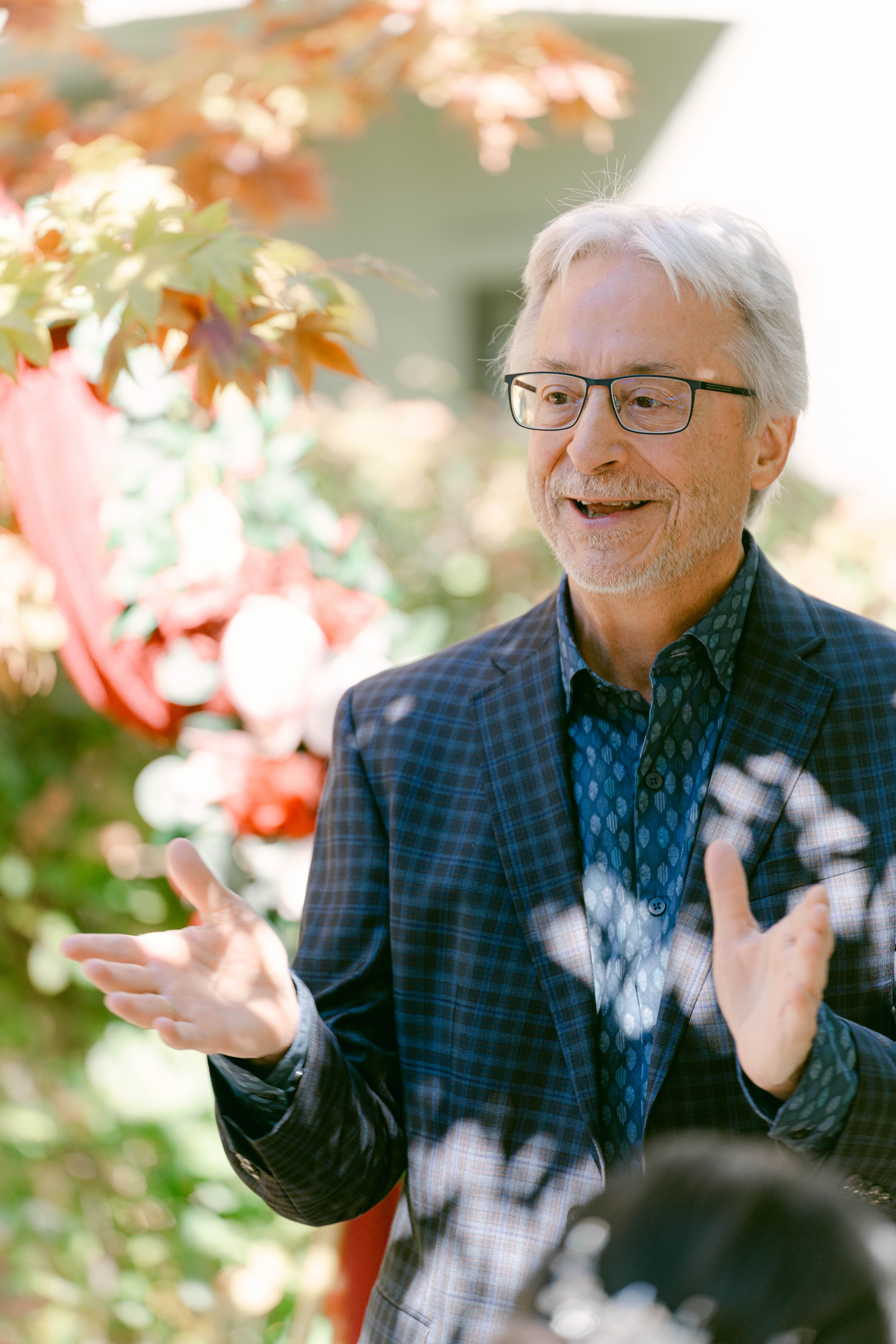
- Beachy at Stanford
- Born: Philip Arden Beachy; October 25, 1958 (age 67); Red Lake, Ontario, Canada
- Citizenship: American
- Education: Goshen College; Stanford University
- Known for: Hedgehog signaling pathway
- Awards: NAS Award in Molecular Biology (1998); March of Dimes Prize in Developmental Biology (2008); Keio Medical Science Prize (2011)
- Scientific career
- Fields: Biochemistry, Developmental & Stem Cell Biology
- Workplaces: Stanford University School of Medicine; Howard Hughes Medical Institute
- Thesis: The UBX Domain in the Bithorax Complex of Drosophila (1986)
- Doctoral advisor: David Hogness
- Notable students: Michelle Monje
- Website: profiles.stanford.edu/philip-beachy; med.stanford.edu/profiles/philip-beachy; pbeachy.stanford.edu; www.hhmi.org/research/hedgehog-signaling-development-and-disease

Philip Arden Beachy (born October 25, 1958) is Ernest and Amelia Gallo Professor at Stanford University School of Medicine. Beachy isolated the Hedgehog gene in flies, discovered how it is processed and released from cells, and identified its signaling mechanism in target cells.

He also studied the roles of Hedgehog signaling in development, regeneration and cancer, discovered small molecules that could block the Hedgehog pathway, and advanced them toward patient treatments.

== Awards and honors ==
Beachy has received numerous awards and prizes for his work, including the

- 1997 Outstanding Young Scientist Award from the Maryland Academy of Sciences
- 1998 National Academy of Sciences Award in Molecular Biology
- 2008 March of Dimes Prize in Developmental Biology jointly with Cliff Tabin.
- 2011 Keio Medical Science Prize.

Beachy was elected a member of the United States National Academy of Sciences in 2002, and a Fellow of the American Academy of Arts and Sciences (2003).

== Research ==
Philip Beachy made several contributions to the understanding of the Hedgehog signaling pathway; he discovered the Hedgehog signaling protein, how it is processed and released from cells, and identified its mechanism of signaling in target cells. Additionally, Beachy revealed critical roles of Hedgehog signaling in embryonic development, uncovering the basis of human birth defects, including holoprosencephaly, the most common human birth defect in early gestation, affecting ~1 in 200 fetuses. He established the concept that morphogens, such as the Hedgehog protein, form extracellular signaling gradients to pattern embryonic tissues, and demonstrated the continued importance of Hedgehog signaling in the maintenance and regeneration of adult organs. Beachy also pioneered small molecule Hedgehog pathway inhibitors, leading to FDA approval of three such inhibitors (vismodegib, sonidegib, and glasdegib) for the treatment of basal cell carcinoma and chronic myelogenous leukemia.

=== 1. Hedgehog protein identification ===
Hedgehog signaling was unknown when Beachy began his work in the early 1990s. Nüsslein-Volhard's and Wieschaus's seminal 1980 study showed that hedgehog mutations cause unusual bristle patterns in Drosophila embryos. Beachy isolated the Drosophila hedgehog gene and revealed that it encodes a secreted signaling protein, thus launching the field of Hedgehog signaling.

Beachy also identified Hedgehog genes critical for the embryonic development of vertebrates, including mammals. He found, surprisingly, that during its production and release the Hedgehog protein autocatalytically cleaves itself and acquires two lipid modifications, cholesterol and palmitate. These lipids render the Hedgehog signal hydrophobic and shape its cellular distribution throughout tissues. These discoveries established covalent lipid modification as a novel mechanism for regulating signaling protein activity; such lipid modification was later extended to Wnt signaling proteins which, like Hedgehog, play important roles in development, regeneration, and cancer.

Beachy also discovered how Hedgehog is released from the cell. The Dispatched protein, powered by Na^{+} flux through its transmembrane ion channel, extracts the lipid-modified Hedgehog protein from the membrane and releases it as a complex with its carrier Scube, enabling its long-range action as a developmental signal.

=== 2. Hedgehog signal transduction mechanisms ===
How is the extracellular Hedgehog signal transmitted to the interior of target cells? Beachy purified active Hedgehog protein and showed that it binds a transmembrane receptor, Patched. Genetically, Patched was known to inhibit the downstream Hedgehog pathway activator, Smoothened. Hedgehog binding to Patched activates the pathway by alleviating Patched-mediated suppression of Smoothened. This theme of signaling through relief of inhibition recurs in other signaling pathways.

In resolving the longstanding mystery of how Patched represses Smoothened Beachy found that cholesterol binding activates Smoothened, and that Patched constitutively represses Smoothened by removing accessible cholesterol from the inner leaflet of the plasma membrane. Hedgehog binding to Patched blocks the cholesterol conduit within Patched, thereby restoring inner-leaflet cholesterol and permitting Smoothened activation. As outlined in his recent review, this solution to the longstanding puzzle of how Patched regulates Smoothened revealed a unique and completely novel mode of developmental signaling whereby a common lipid (cholesterol, regulated by Hedgehog via Patched) directly activates a cell-signaling protein (Smoothened).

=== 3. Hedgehog signaling in development, birth defects, and adult tissues ===
Beachy demonstrated the central importance of Hedgehog signaling in vertebrate development, showing that mouse embryos lacking Sonic hedgehog (Shh) or other Hedgehog pathway genes have profound defects in development of the brain, spinal cord, axial skeleton, limbs, and other organs. Beachy found that Hedgehog signals emanating from small groups of cells in signaling centers or organizers (e.g. the notochord) form gradients that pattern adjacent fields of cells. With collaborators, Beachy demonstrated that addition of biochemically purified, functionally active Hedgehog protein to explanted embryonic tissues induced different cell-types in a concentration-dependent fashion. This is beautifully exemplified in the developing spinal cord, where a Hedgehog signaling gradient specifies the locations of motor neurons, interneurons, and other neuronal types. Beachy’s foundational demonstration of morphogen action in vertebrate development has become a central tenet of developmental biology.

Beachy found that Hedgehog pathway mutations produce cyclopia and other midline face and brain malformations, thus uncovering a mechanism for human holoprosencephaly, the most common first-trimester human birth defect (affecting ~1 in 200 fetuses), often associated with SHH mutations. Human birth defects involving the limbs, skeleton, and other organs are also attributable to mutations affecting Hedgehog signaling. The current literature on human birth defects thus is full of references to Beachy’s work. His seminal 1996 Nature article describing developmental defects in Shh-/- mouse embryos is one of the most highly-cited developmental genetics papers, with over 3600 citations.

Beachy also demonstrated a continuing requirement for Hedgehog signaling in maintenance and regeneration of multiple adult tissues, entailing reciprocal signaling between epithelial and mesenchymal cells. Beachy showed that this Hedgehog-driven epithelial-mesenchymal feedback loop operates in many organs, including bladder, prostate, pancreas, and colon, thus suggesting new treatments for certain degenerative diseases and cancers.

=== 4. Human therapies ===
When Beachy initiated his work on Hedgehog in the 1990s, there were few—if any—pharmacologic tools to modulate developmental signaling pathways. In a story, Beachy discovered such tools for Hedgehog. In the 1950s, one-eyed cyclopic lambs were born in Idaho, attributable to a plant-derived compound, cyclopamine. Beachy noted the similarity to cyclopic Shh^{-/-} mice and in a leap demonstrated that cyclopamine inhibits Hedgehog signaling. Beachy’s lab pioneered small molecule Hedgehog pathway inhibitors and showed such inhibitors can treat cancers caused by dysregulated Hedgehog pathway activity, including a mouse model of the childhood brain cancer, medulloblastoma. Collectively, cyclopamine and other synthetic Hedgehog pathway modulators discovered by Beachy have provided a powerful and widely used pharmacological toolkit.

Publications and patents from Beachy’s laboratory have now led to the FDA approval of three Hedgehog pathway inhibitors (vismodegib, sonidegib, and glasdegib, all cyclopamine mimics) that have been approved by the FDA as therapeutics for advanced basal cell carcinoma and acute myelogenous leukemia, with therapeutic use for additional Hedgehog-linked cancers and other indications such as fibrosis likely to receive FDA approval in the future.

== Career ==
After receiving his Ph.D, he worked as an independent fellow (Staff Associate) at the Carnegie Institution's Department of Embryology in Baltimore for two years. He then accepted a faculty position at the Johns Hopkins University School of Medicine and in the Howard Hughes Medical Institute. In 2006, Beachy moved from Johns Hopkins to Stanford University School of Medicine, where he has been affiliated with the Institute for Stem Cell Biology and Regenerative Medicine and has held appointments in the Departments of Developmental Biology, Biochemistry, and Urology.

== Early life ==
Beachy was born in Red Lake, Ontario, Canada, on October 25, 1958. Beachy spent eight of his early years of life in the hills of central Puerto Rico. His father was a pastor of a rural church. He attended a school taught in Spanish during the day and then learned to read and write English once he came home from school. At nine, Beachy and his family returned to their home base of Goshen, Indiana where he began attending public school. At the early age of 16, Beachy headed off to Goshen College which was very close to home. At this time, Beachy still did not know of his love for science. “Unlike many people who knew they were going to be scientists from a very early age, I didn't decide that I would try to become a scientist until fairly late on in college,” he says.

== Education ==
Beachy received his bachelor's degree in natural sciences at Goshen College. Beachy first envisioned himself as a doctor, but eventually decided to pursue biological research. He became interested in this field after reading a serialized form of Horace Freeland Judson's book, The Eighth Day of Creation in The New Yorker. "Reading those articles got me excited about molecular biology," says Beachy. After graduating, he continued to do more research and took chemistry courses at the nearby South Bend campus of Indiana University. He then decided to attend graduate school at Stanford University and studied the molecular genetics of fruit fly development with David Hogness. Beachy earned his Ph.D. in biochemistry in 1986 at Stanford for research into the Ultrabithorax homeotic gene and its products.

== Personal life ==
Beachy is married to Katrin Andreasson and is the brother of historian Robert M. Beachy, and a cousin of biologist Roger N. Beachy and author Stephen Beachy.
