= Cyclopamine =

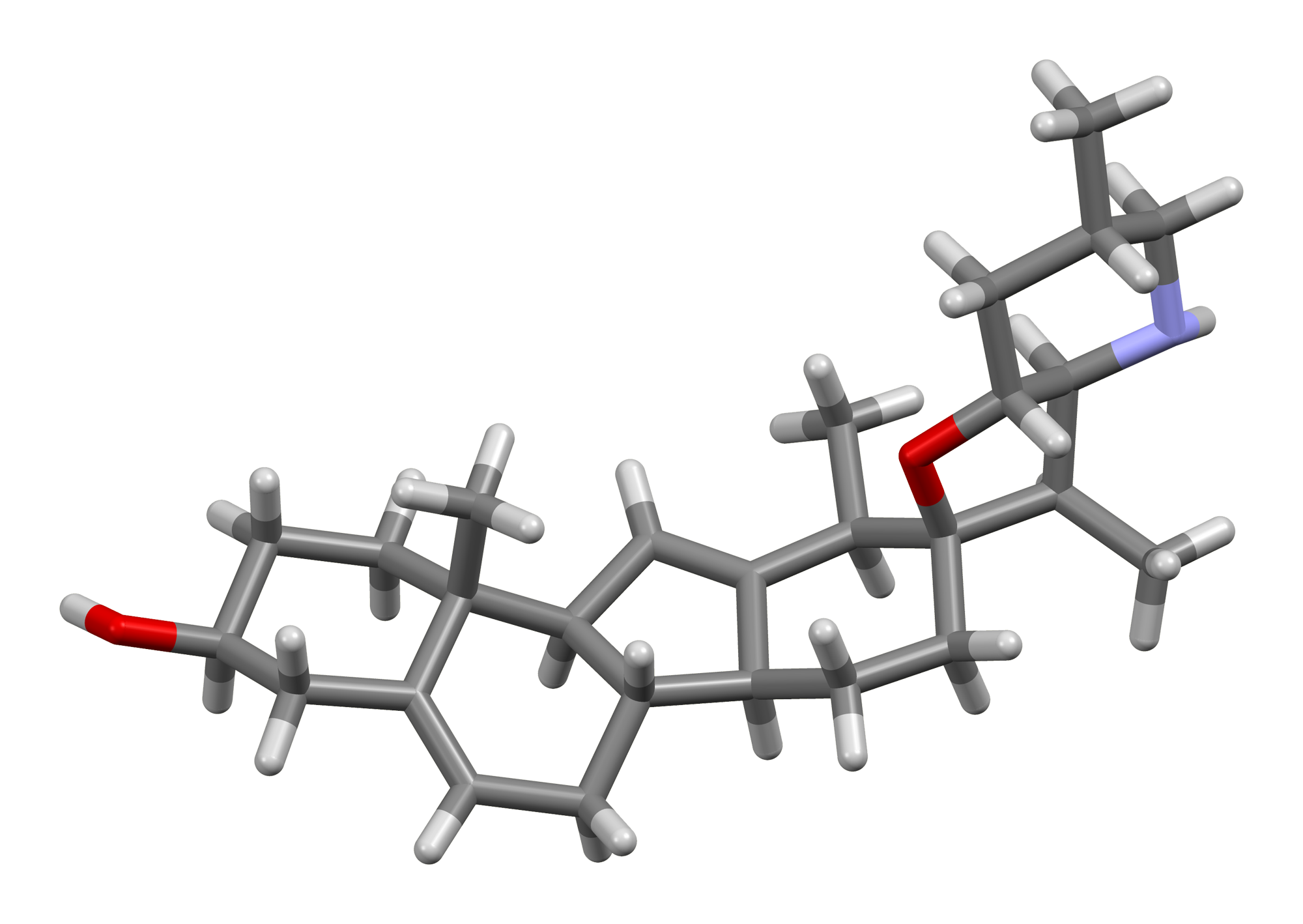

Names
- IUPAC name 17,23β-Epoxyveratraman-3β-ol
- Systematic IUPAC name (2′R,3S,3′R,3′aS,6′S,6aS,6bS,7′aR,11aS,11bR)-3′,6′,10,11b-Tetramethyl-1,2,3,3′a,4,4′,5′,6,6′,6a,6b,7,7′,7′a,8,11,11a,11b-octadecahydro-3′H-spiro[benzo[a]fluorene-9,2′-furo[3,2-b]pyridin]-3-ol
- Other names • 11-Deoxojervine • (3β,23R)-17,23-Epoxyveratraman-3-ol

Identifiers
CAS Number	4449-51-8
3D model (JSmol)	Interactive image
ChEMBL	ChEMBL254129
ChemSpider	391275
ECHA InfoCard	100.156.363
PubChem CID	442972
UNII	ZH658AJ192
CompTox Dashboard (EPA)	DTXSID6043709
- InChI: InChI=1S/C27H41NO2/c1-15-11-24-25(28-14-15)17(3)27(30-24)10-8-20-21-6-5-18-12-19(29)7-9-26(18,4)23(21)13-22(20)16(27)2/h5,15,17,19-21,23-25,28-29H,6-14H2,1-4H3/t15-,17+,19-,20-,21-,23-,24+,25-,26-,27-/m0/s1 Key: QASFUMOKHFSJGL-LAFRSMQTSA-N; InChI=1/C27H41NO2/c1-15-11-24-25(28-14-15)17(3)27(30-24)10-8-20-21-6-5-18-12-19(29)7-9-26(18,4)23(21)13-22(20)16(27)2/h5,15,17,19-21,23-25,28-29H,6-14H2,1-4H3/t15-,17+,19-,20-,21-,23-,24+,25-,26-,27-/m0/s1 Key: QASFUMOKHFSJGL-LAFRSMQTBZ
- SMILES: C[C@H]1C[C@@H]2[C@H]([C@H]([C@]3(O2)CC[C@H]4[C@@H]5CC=C6C[C@H](CC[C@@]6([C@H]5CC4=C3C)C)O)C)NC1

Properties
Chemical formula	C_{27}H_{41}NO_{2}
Molar mass	411.630 g·mol^{−1}
- Except where otherwise noted, data are given for materials in their standard state (at 25 °C [77 °F], 100 kPa). verify (what is ?) Infobox references

Cyclopamine (11-deoxojervine) is a naturally occurring steroidal alkaloid. It is a teratogenic component of corn lily (Veratrum californicum), which when consumed during gestation has been demonstrated to induce birth defects, including the development of a single eye (cyclopia) in offspring. The molecule was named after this effect, which was originally observed by Idaho lamb farmers in 1957 after their herds gave birth to cycloptic lambs. It then took more than a decade to identify corn lily as the culprit. Later work suggested that differing rain patterns had changed grazing behaviours, which led to a greater quantity of corn lily to be ingested by pregnant sheep. Cyclopamine interrupts the sonic hedgehog signalling pathway, instrumental in early development, ultimately causing birth defects.

== Discovery and naming ==
In 1957, Idaho sheep ranchers contacted the US Department of Agriculture (USDA) after their sheep gave birth to lambs with a fatal singular eye deformity. After collecting local flora and feeding them to mice, USDA scientists struggled to recreate the cyclopia. After a decade of trial and error, they came across wild corn lilies and advised the ranchers to avoid the corn lilies. Cyclopamine was discovered as one of three steroidal alkaloids isolated from Veratrum californicum and was named after its effects on sheep embryos. Four decades later, a team led by Professor Phillip Beachy linked the effect of cyclopamine to the sonic hedgehog gene. Cyclopia was induced through silencing the sonic hedgehog gene, suggesting Cyclopamine acted through a similar mechanism.

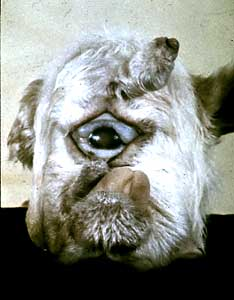
Head of a lamb born by a sheep that consumed Veratrum californicum (California corn lily). Cyclopia is induced by the cyclopamine and other teratogenic alkaloids present in the plant.

== Source and structure ==
Cyclopamine consists of six rings, including a C-nor-D-homosteroid backbone linked to a octahydrofuro[3,2-b]pyridine system through a spirocentre. The molecule contains ten chiral centres, six of which at ring junctions.

The Veratrum species were found to contain five related families of alkaloids: (1) solanidine alkaloids, (2) verazine alkaloids, (3) veratramine alkaloids, (4) jervine alkaloids, and (5) the cevanine alkaloids, each of which with cholesterol as a common precursor.

In its proposed biosynthesis, cyclopamine has a solanidine precursor. This was determined through initial studies which isolated alkaloids from Veratrum californium, and introduced these to embryonic sheep.

Considering its formation in vivo, the treatment of cyclopamine with dilute hydrochloric acid (0.5%) at 38 °C leads to the formation of veratramine - conditions similar to those of gastric acid. Veratramine is highly toxic, acting through excitation of the central nervous system causing seizures – similarly to serotonin. The mechanism for the formation of veratramine from cyclopamine is proposed to take place through the cleavage of the spirocyclic carbon-oxygen bond in the THF ring, which through elimination leads to the formation of a double bond. Afforded by the strong driving force afforded by aromatisation, ultimately a benzene ring forms.

Later studies also demonstrated that jervine could be degraded to cyclopamine through a Wolff-Kishner reduction, which served as evidence for the structure of cyclopamine.

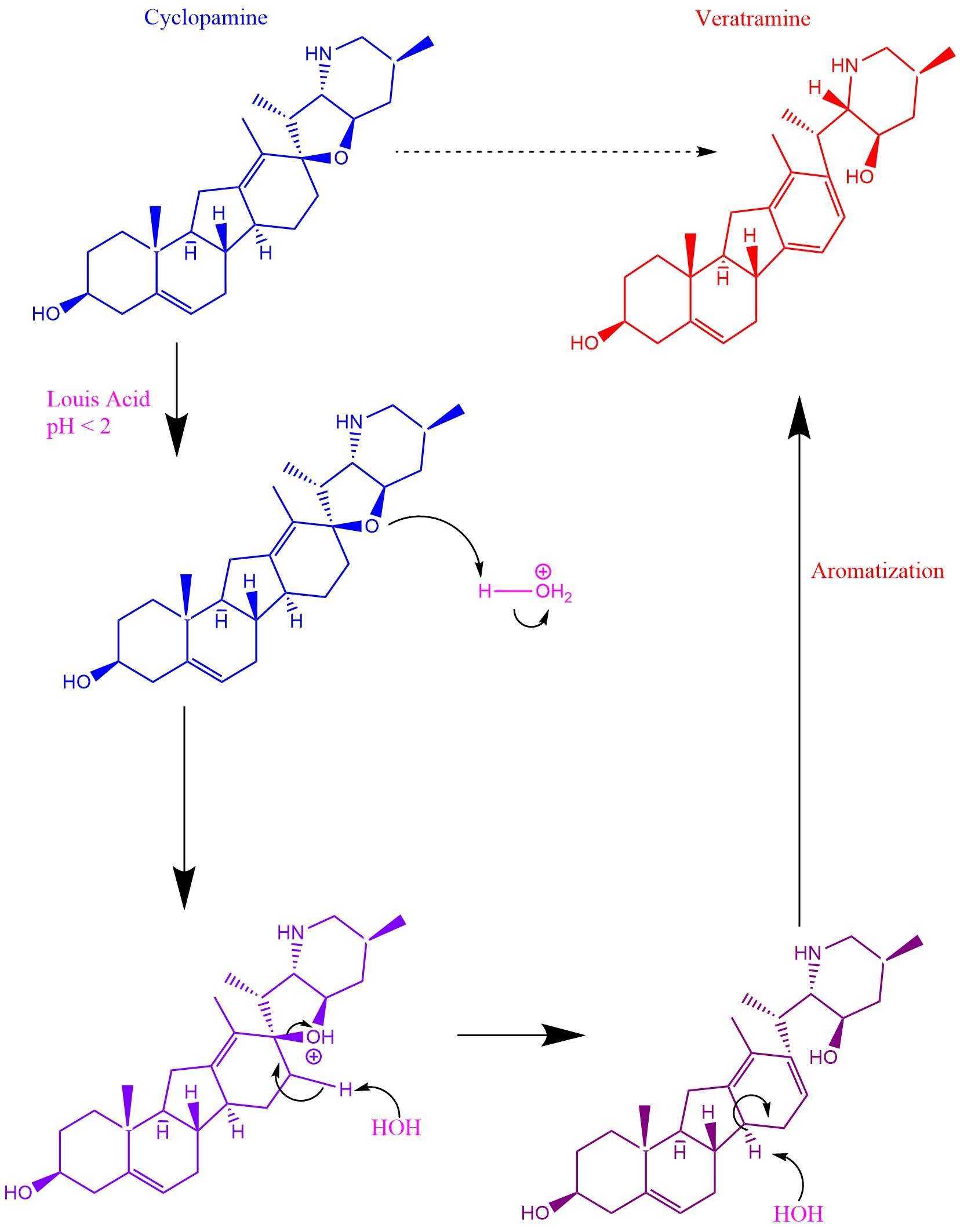
Proposed mechanism for the formation of veratramine from cyclopamine in acidic conditions.

== Mechanism ==
Cyclopamine impacts embryonic development by interrupting the sonic hedgehog (Shh) pathway.

In healthy development, the Shh gene codes for the Shh protein. This protein has a high affinity for the cell receptor patched. Upon binding, SHH forms an inhibitory complex with patched. With the patch protein inhibited, another surface membrane protein known as smoothened may signal further cascades which impact development.

Cyclopamine has a high affinity for smoothened – and upon binding, inhibits the signal. Even though Shh still binds Patched, Smoothened cannot signal in the presence of cyclopamine and thus the pathway is interrupted.

== Embryological ==
Cyclopamine causes the most advanced form of holoprosencephaly. Because it blocks Shh signaling, the embryonic brain no longer divides into lobes (becomes alobar). Thus, only one optical track develops, hence the cycloptic (singular) eye. Furthermore, this disease is fatal and presently has no cure.

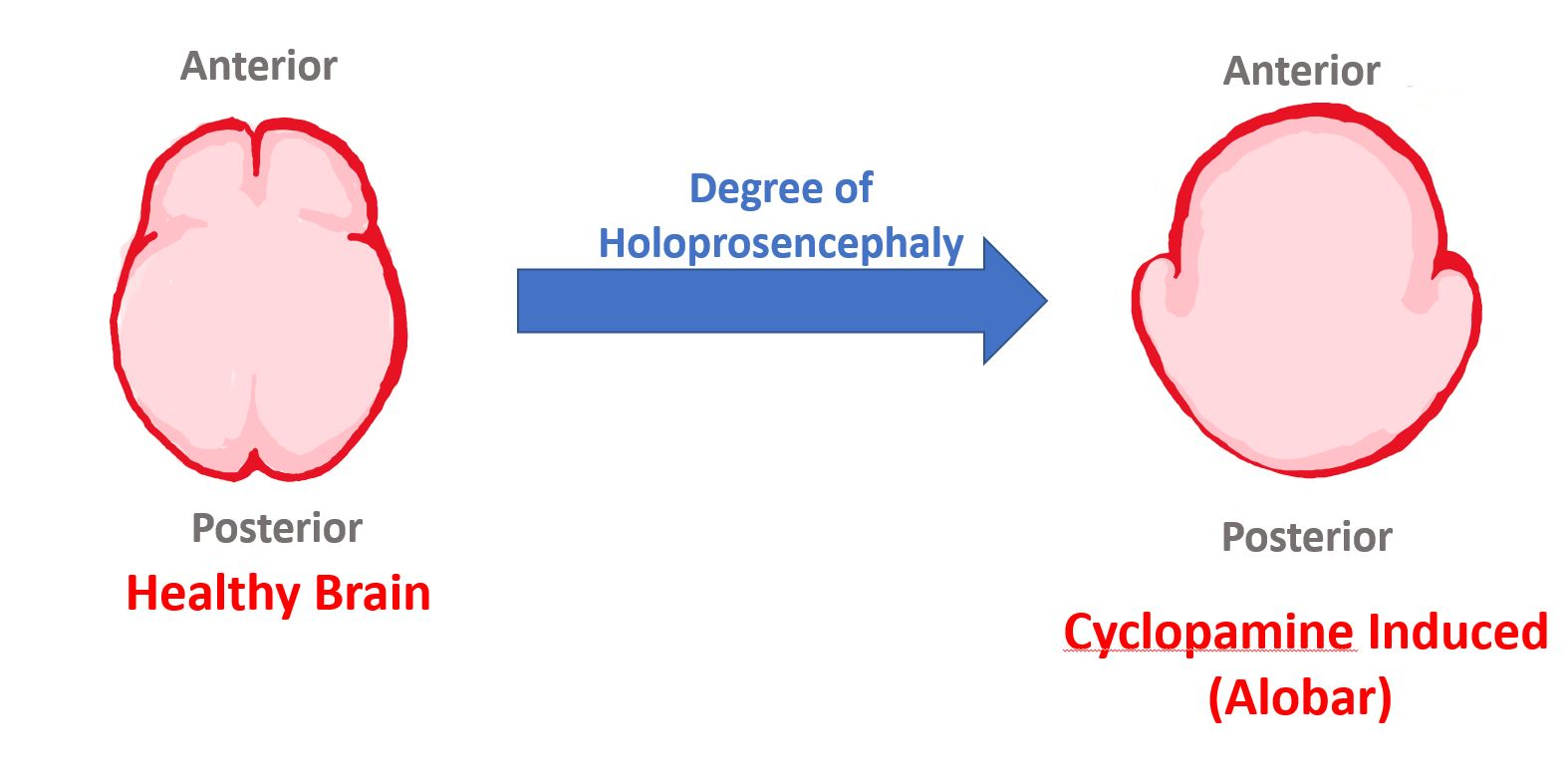
In this figure, the healthy brain (left) has two lobes whereas the developmentally affected brain through action of cyclopamine (right) has a severe state of holoprosencephaly and is alobar (has no lobes).

One can imagine one half of the healthy brain not dividing, but instead growing out and resembling the alobar brain. This occurs in cases of cyclopamine poisoning. This malformation is always fatal, and it is worth noting that there are lesser cases of holoprosencephaly that are not always fatal. However, embryonic cyclopamine poisoning causes the most extreme and therefore fatal cases.

== Medical potential ==
Cyclopamine is currently being investigated as a treatment agent in basal cell carcinoma, medulloblastoma and rhabdomyosarcoma (tumours commonly resulting from excessive Shh activity), glioblastoma, and as a treatment agent for multiple myeloma. Studies of epithelial cancers have demonstrated that tumour cells secrete Shh ligand to signal adjacent growth factors production by stromal cells which leads to angiogenesis, tumour cell proliferation, and tumour cell survival.

With this in mind, one can imagine cyclopamine as a way of attenuating cancer's mechanism. However, while cyclopamine has been demonstrated to inhibit tumor growth in mouse xenograft models, it never reached therapeutic potential as it caused many side effects including weight loss, dehydration, and death in mouse models.

Two functional analogs of cyclopamine have been approved by the FDA; vismodegib in 2012, and sonidegib in 2015. Vismodegib was the first Shh pathway drug approved for treating cancer.

Vismodegib was designed to account for hydrogen bonding with the Smoothened receptor and to overcome the solubility issues of cyclopamine (through inclusion of the chlorine atom). The hydrogen bonds form at two sites: as a donor at a tyrosine residue and as an acceptor at an arginine residue. Whilst the hydrogen bond accepting group is more impactful, having both makes for stronger binding.

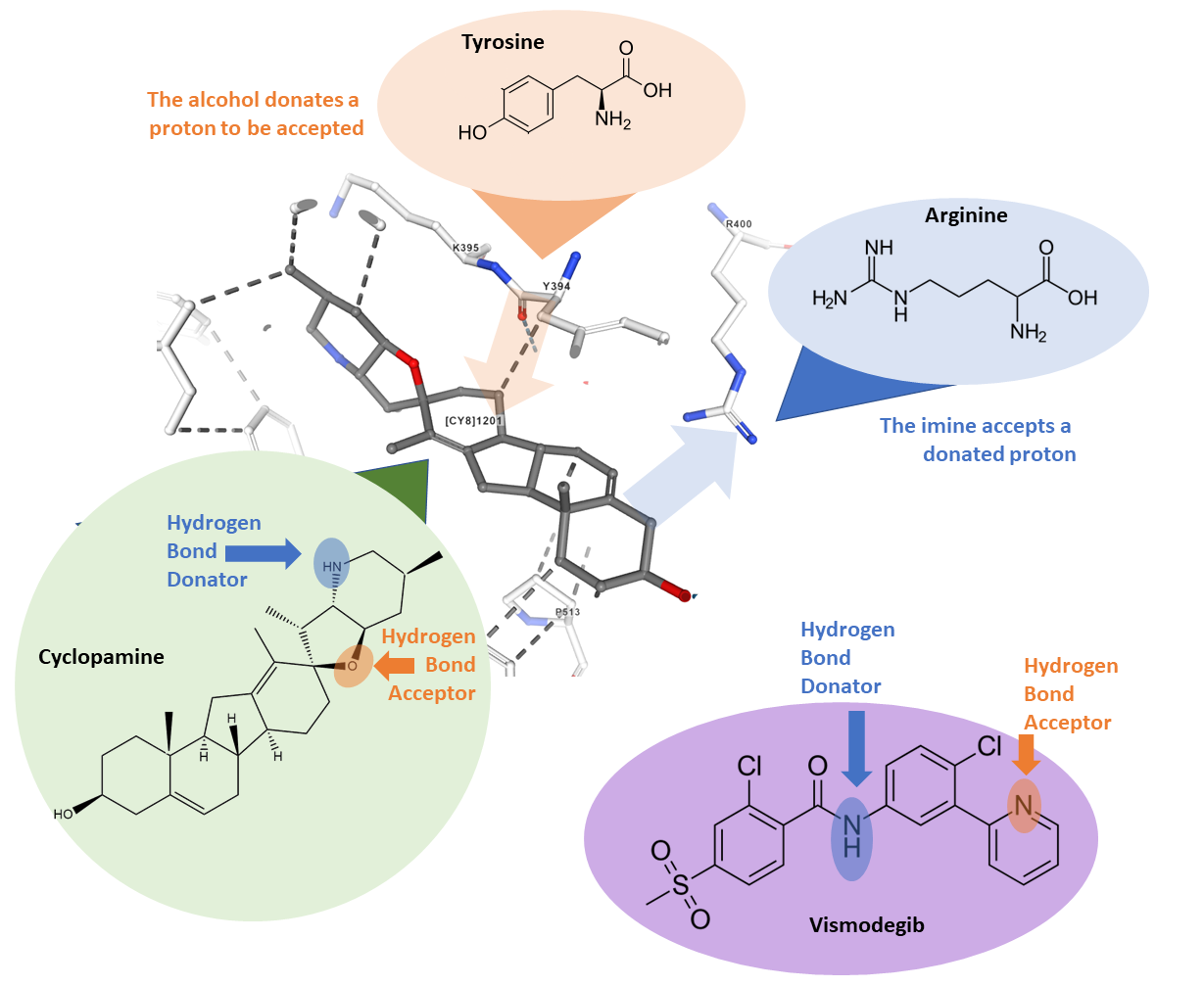
The structural similarities and differences between cyclopamine and vismodegib (a drug derived from cyclopamine). Both interrupt sonic hedgehog signalling; however vismodegib is more soluble and is a FDA approved drug. The 3D structure is a representation of the binding of cyclopamine in the Smoothened receptor, which would have been discovered through crystallisation and X-ray crystallography. There are two main hydrogen bonds which stabilise this interaction: one in which a tyrosine residue acts as a hydrogen bond donor, and one in which an arginine acts as a hydrogen bond acceptor. A main difference between vismodegib and cyclopamine is that the pyridine nitrogen of vismodegib is a more effective proton acceptor than the THF ring oxygen in cyclopamine. Because of this, vismodegib has a higher affinity for the receptor.

== See also ==
- Saridegib (also known as IPI-926), a semisynthetic analog of cyclopamine
- Vismodegib, an artificial Hh signaling inhibitor
- Sonidegib, an artificial Hh signaling inhibitor
- Steroidal alkaloid, the family of molecules cyclopamine belongs to
