= Saridegib =

Experimental drug

Names
- IUPAC name N-[(5βH)-5,6-Dihydro-17,23β-epoxy-16a-homoveratraman-3α-yl]methanesulfonamide
- Systematic IUPAC name N-[(2S,3R,3′R,3aS,4′aR,6S,6′aR,6′bS,7aR,12′aS,12′bS)-3,6,11′,12′b-Tetramethyl-2′,3′,3a,4,4′,4′a,5,5′,6,6′,6′a,6′b,7,7′,7a,8′,10′,12′,12′a,12′b-icosahydro-1′H,3H-spiro[furo[3,2-b]pyridine-2,9′-naphtho[2,1-a]azulen]-3′-yl]methanesulfonamide
- Other names saridegib & Patidegib

Identifiers
CAS Number	1037210-93-7
3D model (JSmol)	Interactive image
ChEMBL	ChEMBL538867
ChemSpider	26353073
IUPHAR/BPS	8198
KEGG	D10324
PubChem CID	25027363
UNII	JT96FPU35X
CompTox Dashboard (EPA)	DTXSID40146032
- InChI: InChI=1S/C29H48N2O3S/c1-17-12-26-27(30-16-17)19(3)29(34-26)11-9-22-23-7-6-20-13-21(31-35(5,32)33)8-10-28(20,4)25(23)14-24(22)18(2)15-29/h17,19-23,25-27,30-31H,6-16H2,1-5H3/t17-,19+,20+,21+,22-,23-,25-,26+,27-,28-,29-/m0/s1 Key: HZLFFNCLTRVYJG-WWGOJCOQSA-N
- SMILES: C[C@H]1C[C@@H]2[C@H]([C@H]([C@]3(O2)CC[C@H]4[C@@H]5CC[C@@H]6C[C@@H](CC[C@@]6([C@H]5CC4=C(C3)C)C)NS(=O)(=O)C)C)NC1

Properties
Chemical formula	C_{29}H_{48}N_{2}O_{3}S
Molar mass	504.77 g·mol^{−1}

Pharmacology
Routes of administration	Oral
Legal status	Investigational
- Except where otherwise noted, data are given for materials in their standard state (at 25 °C [77 °F], 100 kPa). verify (what is ?) Infobox references

Saridegib, also known as IPI-926, is an experimental drug candidate undergoing clinical trials for the treatment of various types of cancer, including hard-to-treat hematologic malignancies such as myelofibrosis and ligand-dependent tumors such as chondrosarcoma. IPI-926 exhibits its pharmacological effect by inhibition of the G protein-coupled receptor smoothened, a component of the hedgehog signaling pathway. Chemically, it is a semi-synthetic derivative of the alkaloid cyclopamine. The process begins with cyclopamine extracted from harvested Veratrum californicum which is taken through a series of alterations resulting in an analogue of the natural product cyclopamine, making IPI-926 the only compound in development/testing that is not fully synthetic.

Saridegib is a member of a class of anti-cancer compounds known as hedgehog pathway inhibitors.
