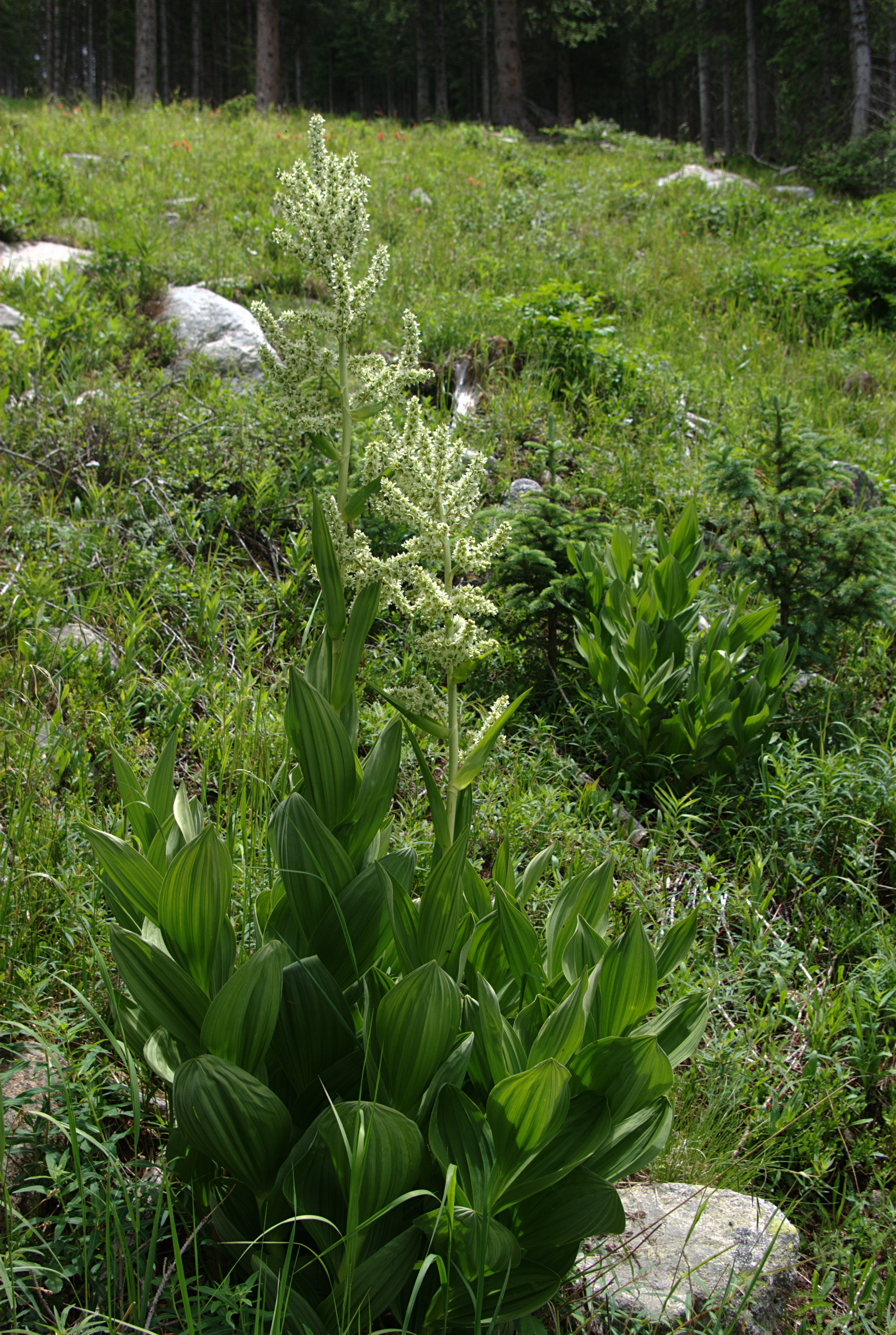

Conservation status
- Secure (NatureServe)

Scientific classification
- Kingdom: Plantae
- Clade: Tracheophytes
- Clade: Angiosperms
- Clade: Monocots
- Order: Liliales
- Family: Melanthiaceae
- Genus: Veratrum
- Species: V. californicum

Binomial name
- Veratrum californicum Durand

Varieties
- V. californicum var. californicum; V. californicum var. caudatum

= Veratrum californicum =

Plant species in the bunchflower family

Veratrum californicum (California corn lily, white or California false hellebore) is an extremely poisonous plant native to western North America, including the Sierra Nevada and Rocky Mountains, as far north as Washington and as far south as Durango; depending on latitude, it grows from near sea level to as high as 11,000 feet. It grows 1 to 2 meters tall, with an erect, unbranched, heavily leafy stem resembling a cornstalk. It prefers quite moist soil, and can cover large areas in dense stands near streams or in wet meadows. Many inch-wide flowers cluster along the often-branched top of the stout stem; they have 6 white tepals, a green center, 6 stamens, and a 3-branched pistil (see image below). The buds are tight green spheres. The heavily veined, bright green leaves can be more than a foot long.

Veratrum californicum displays mast seeding; populations bloom and seed little in most years, but in occasional years bloom and seed heavily in synchrony. The species usually blooms during midsummer from July to August.

Varieties

1. Veratrum californicum var. californicum – from Washington to Durango
2. Veratrum californicum var. caudatum (A.Heller) C.L.Hitchc. – Idaho, Washington, Oregon, N California

== Teratogenic effects ==
It is a source of jervine, muldamine and cyclopamine, teratogens which can cause prolonged gestation associated with birth defects such as holoprosencephaly and cyclopia in animals such as sheep, horses, and other mammals that graze upon it. These substances inhibit the hedgehog signaling pathway.

== Gallery ==
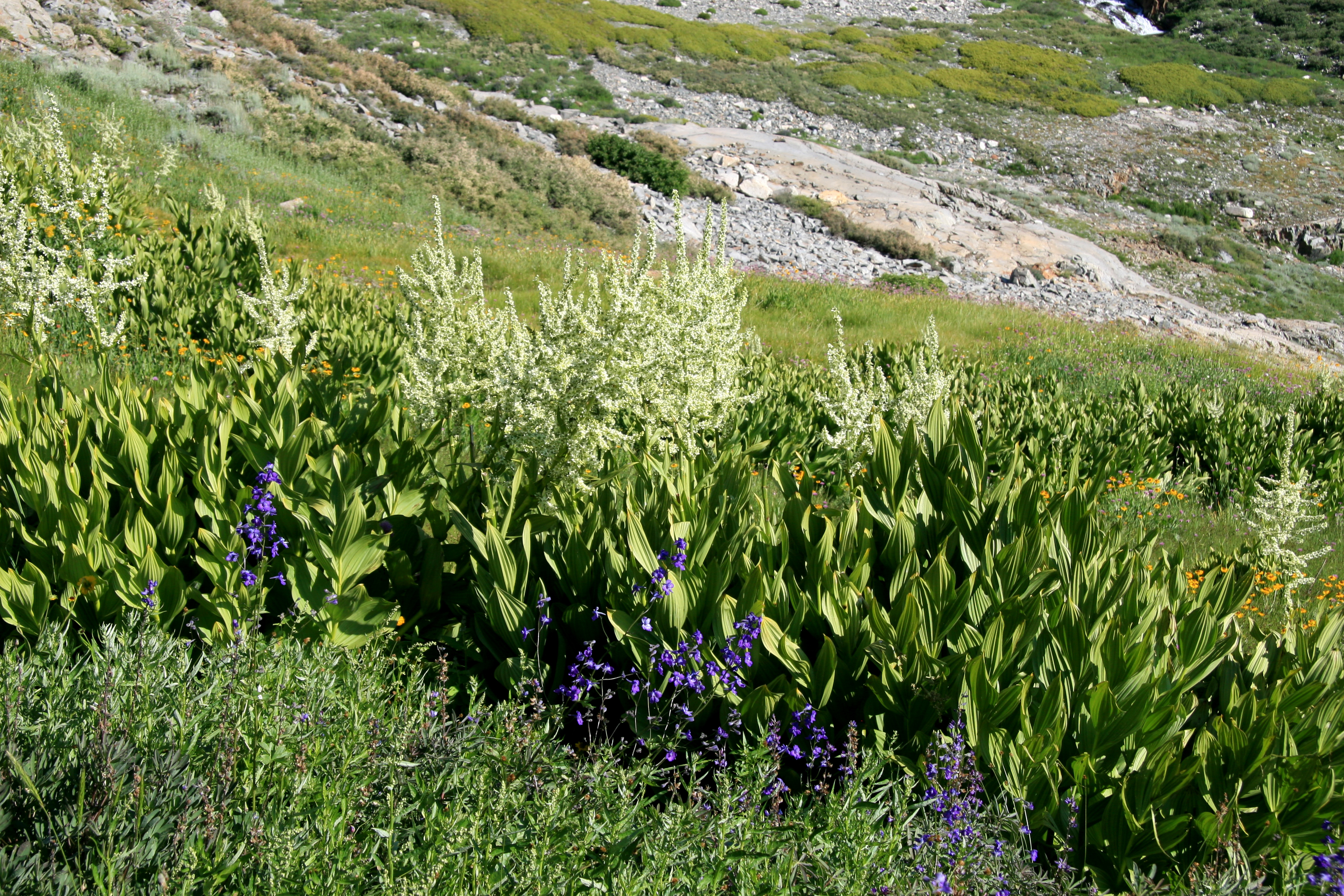
Swath of corn lilies in meadow

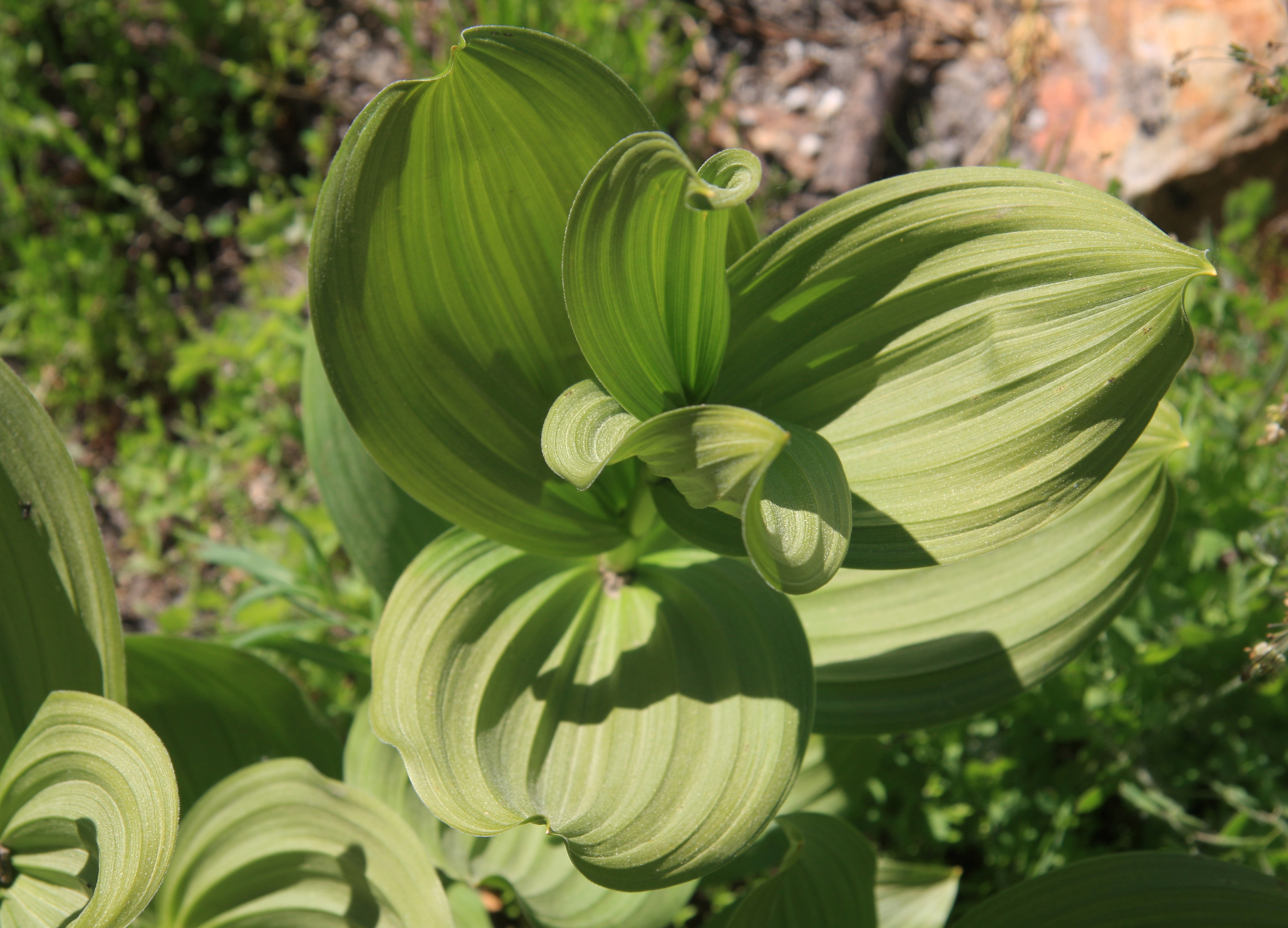
Leaves on a young plant

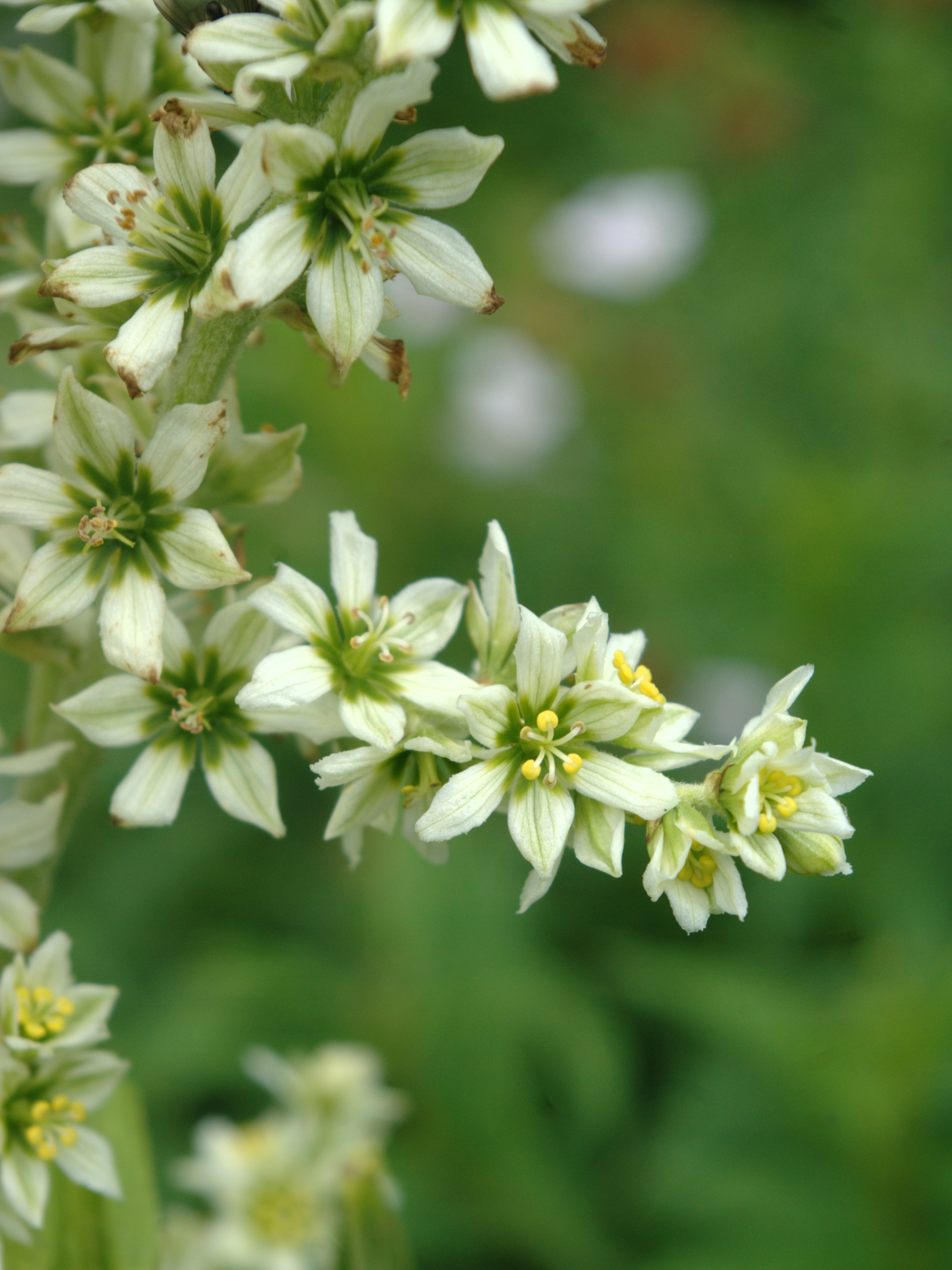
Closeup of flowers
California false hellebore (Veratrum californicum) is an extremely poisonous plant - this one found in Clackamas County, Oregon, U.S.A. 2026.
