= Itraconazole =

Medication used to treat fungal infections

Clinical data
- Trade names: Sporanox, Sporaz, Orungal, others
- Other names: ITZ
- AHFS/Drugs.com: Monograph
- MedlinePlus: a692049
- License data: US DailyMed: Itraconazole
- Pregnancy category: AU: B3
- Routes of administration: By mouth, solution), vaginal suppository, intravenous
- ATC code: J02AC02 (WHO)

Legal status
- Legal status: AU: S4 (Prescription only); CA: ℞-only; UK: POM (Prescription only); US: ℞-only

Pharmacokinetic data
- Bioavailability: ~55%, maximal if taken with full meal
- Protein binding: 99.8%
- Metabolism: Extensive in liver (CYP3A4)
- Metabolites: Hydroxy-itraconazole, keto-itraconazole, N-desalkyl-itraconazole
- Elimination half-life: 21 hours
- Excretion: Kidney (35%), faeces (54%)

Identifiers
- IUPAC name: (±)-1-[(RS)-sec-butyl]-4-[p-[4-[p-[[(2R,4S)-rel-2-(2,4-dichlorophenyl)-2-(1H-1,2,4-triazol-1-ylmethyl)-1,3-dioxolan-4-yl]methoxy]phenyl]-1-piperazinyl]phenyl]-Δ^{2}-1,2,4-triazolin-5-one
- CAS Number: 84625-61-6
- PubChem CID: 55283
- DrugBank: DB01167
- ChemSpider: 49927
- UNII: 304NUG5GF4
- KEGG: D00350
- ChEBI: CHEBI:6076
- ChEMBL: ChEMBL22587
- CompTox Dashboard (EPA): DTXSID3023180
- ECHA InfoCard: 100.123.596

Chemical and physical data
- Formula: C_{35}H_{38}Cl_{2}N_{8}O_{4}
- Molar mass: 705.64 g·mol^{−1}
- 3D model (JSmol): Interactive image
- Chirality: Racemic mixture
- Melting point: 165 °C (329 °F)
- Solubility in water: 7.8 ± 0.4 × 10^{−6} mol/L (pH 1.6) mg/mL (20 °C)
- SMILES: O=C1N(/N=C\N1c2ccc(cc2)N7CCN(c6ccc(OC[C@@H]3O[C@](OC3)(c4ccc(Cl)cc4Cl)Cn5ncnc5)cc6)CC7)C(C)CC
- InChI: InChI=1S/C35H38Cl2N8O4/c1-3-25(2)45-34(46)44(24-40-45)29-7-5-27(6-8-29)41-14-16-42(17-15-41)28-9-11-30(12-10-28)47-19-31-20-48-35(49-31,21-43-23-38-22-39-43)32-13-4-26(36)18-33(32)37/h4-13,18,22-25,31H,3,14-17,19-21H2,1-2H3/t25?,31-,35-/m0/s1; Key:VHVPQPYKVGDNFY-ZPGVKDDISA-N

Itraconazole, sometimes abbreviated ITZ, is an antifungal medication used to treat a number of fungal infections. This includes aspergillosis, blastomycosis, coccidioidomycosis, histoplasmosis, and paracoccidioidomycosis. It may be given by mouth or intravenously.

Common side effects include nausea, diarrhea, abdominal pain, rash, and headache. Severe side effects may include liver problems, heart failure, Stevens–Johnson syndrome and allergic reactions including anaphylaxis. It is unclear if use during pregnancy or breastfeeding is safe. It is in the triazole family of medications. It stops fungal growth by affecting the cell membrane or affecting their metabolism.

Itraconazole was patented in 1978 and approved for medical use in the United States in 1992. It is on the World Health Organization's List of Essential Medicines.

Recent research works suggest itraconazole (ITZ) could also be used in the treatment of cancer by inhibiting the hedgehog pathway in a similar way to sonidegib.

== Medical uses ==
Itraconazole has a broader spectrum of activity than fluconazole (but not as broad as voriconazole or posaconazole). In particular, it is active against Aspergillus, which fluconazole is not. It is also licensed for use in blastomycosis, sporotrichosis, histoplasmosis, and onychomycosis. Itraconazole is over 99% protein-bound and has virtually no penetration into cerebrospinal fluid. Therefore, it should not be used to treat meningitis or other central nervous system infections. According to the Johns Hopkins Abx Guide, it has "negligible CSF penetration, however treatment has been successful for cryptococcal and coccidioidal meningitis".

It is also prescribed for systemic infections, such as aspergillosis, candidiasis, and cryptococcosis, where other antifungal drugs are inappropriate or ineffective.

Itraconazole has been explored as an anticancer agent for patients with basal cell carcinoma, non-small cell lung cancer, glioblastoma and prostate cancer, For example, in a phase II study involving men with advanced prostate cancer, high-dose itraconazole (600 mg/day) was associated with significant PSA responses and a delay in tumor progression. Itraconazole also showed activity in a phase II trial in men with non-small cell lung cancer when it was combined with the chemotherapy agent, pemetrexed. A recent review also highlights its use topically and orally in conjunction with other chemotherapeutic agents for advanced and metastatic basal cell carcinomas that cannot be treated surgically.

=== Available forms ===
Itraconazole is produced as blue 22 mm (0.87 in) capsules with tiny 1.5 mm (0.059 in) blue pellets inside. Each capsule contains 100 mg and is usually taken twice a day at twelve-hour intervals. The Sporanox brand of itraconazole has been developed and marketed by Janssen Pharmaceutica, a subsidiary of Johnson & Johnson. The three-layer structure of these blue capsules is complex because itraconazole is insoluble and is sensitive to pH. The complicated procedure not only requires a specialized machine to create it, but also the method used has manufacturing problems. Also, the pill is quite large, making it difficult for many patients to swallow. Parts of the processes of creating Sporanox were discovered by the Korean Patent Laid-open No. 10-2001-2590. The tiny blue pellets contained in the capsule are manufactured in Beerse, Belgium.

The oral solution is better absorbed. The cyclodextrin contained in the oral solution can cause an osmotic diarrhea, and if this is a problem, then half the dose can be given as oral solution and half as capsule to reduce the amount of cyclodextrin given. "Sporanox" itraconazole capsules should always be taken with food, as this improves absorption, however the manufacturers of "Lozanoc" assert that it may be taken "without regard to meals". Itraconazole oral solution should be taken an hour before food, or two hours after food (and likewise if a combination of capsules and oral solution are used). Itraconazole may be taken with orange juice or cola, as absorption is also improved by acid. Absorption of itraconazole is impaired when taken with an antacid, H_{2} blocker or proton pump inhibitor.

== Side effects ==
Itraconazole is a relatively well-tolerated drug (although not as well tolerated as fluconazole or voriconazole) and the range of adverse effects it produces is similar to the other azole antifungals:

- elevated alanine aminotransferase levels are found in 4% of people taking itraconazole
- "small but real risk" of developing congestive heart failure
- liver failure, sometimes fatal

The cyclodextrin used to make the syrup preparation can cause diarrhea. Side effects that may indicate a greater problem include:

- nausea
- vomiting
- abdominal pain
- fatigue
- loss of appetite
- yellow skin (jaundice)
- yellow eyes
- itching
- dark urine
- pale stool
- headache

== Interactions ==
The following drugs should not be taken with itraconazole:

- amiodarone (Cordarone);
- cisapride
- dofetilide
- nisoldipine
- alcohol
- pimozide
- quinidine
- lurasidone
- lovastatin or simvastatin
- midazolam or triazolam
- ergot medicines such as
  - dihydroergotamine
  - ergometrine
  - ergotamine
  - methylergonovine

== Pharmacology ==
=== Pharmacodynamics ===
The mechanism of action of itraconazole is the same as the other azole antifungals: it inhibits the fungal-mediated synthesis of ergosterol, via inhibition of lanosterol 14α-demethylase. Because of its ability to inhibit cytochrome P450 3A4 CC-3, caution should be used when considering interactions with other medications.

Itraconazole is pharmacologically distinct from other azole antifungal agents in that it is the only inhibitor in this class that has been shown to inhibit both the hedgehog signaling pathway and angiogenesis. These distinct activities are unrelated to inhibition of the cytochrome P450 lanosterol 14 alpha-demethylase and the exact molecular targets responsible remain unidentified. Functionally, the antiangiogenic activity of itraconazole has been shown to be linked to inhibition of glycosylation, VEGFR2 phosphorylation, trafficking, and cholesterol biosynthesis pathways. Evidence suggests the structural determinants for inhibition of hedgehog signaling by itraconazole are recognizably different from those associated with antiangiogenic activity.

=== Pharmacokinetics ===
Itraconazole, like cyclosporine, quinidine, and clarithromycin, can inhibit P-glycoprotein, causing drug interactions by reducing elimination and increasing absorption of organic cation drugs. With conventional itraconazole preparations serum levels can vary greatly between patients, often resulting in serum concentrations lower than the therapeutic index. It has therefore been conventionally advised that patients take itraconazole after a fatty meal rather than prior to eating.

A product (Lozanoc) licensed through the European union decentralised procedure has increased bioavailability, decreased sensitivity to co ingestion of food, and hence decreased variability of serum levels.

== Chemistry ==
Chiral centers are marked by asterisks

The itraconazole molecule has three chiral carbons. The two chiral centers in the dioxolane ring are fixed in relation to one another, and the triazolomethylene and aryloxymethylene dioxolane-ring substituents are always cis to each other. The clinical formulation is a 1:1:1:1 mixture of four stereoisomers (two enantiomeric pairs).

Four diastereomers of itraconazole

== History ==
Itraconazole was approved for medical use in the United States in 1992.

It was designated an orphan drug by both the US Food and Drug Administration (FDA) and the European Medicines Agency (EMA).
