= Michelle Monje =

American neurologist and researcher (born 1978)

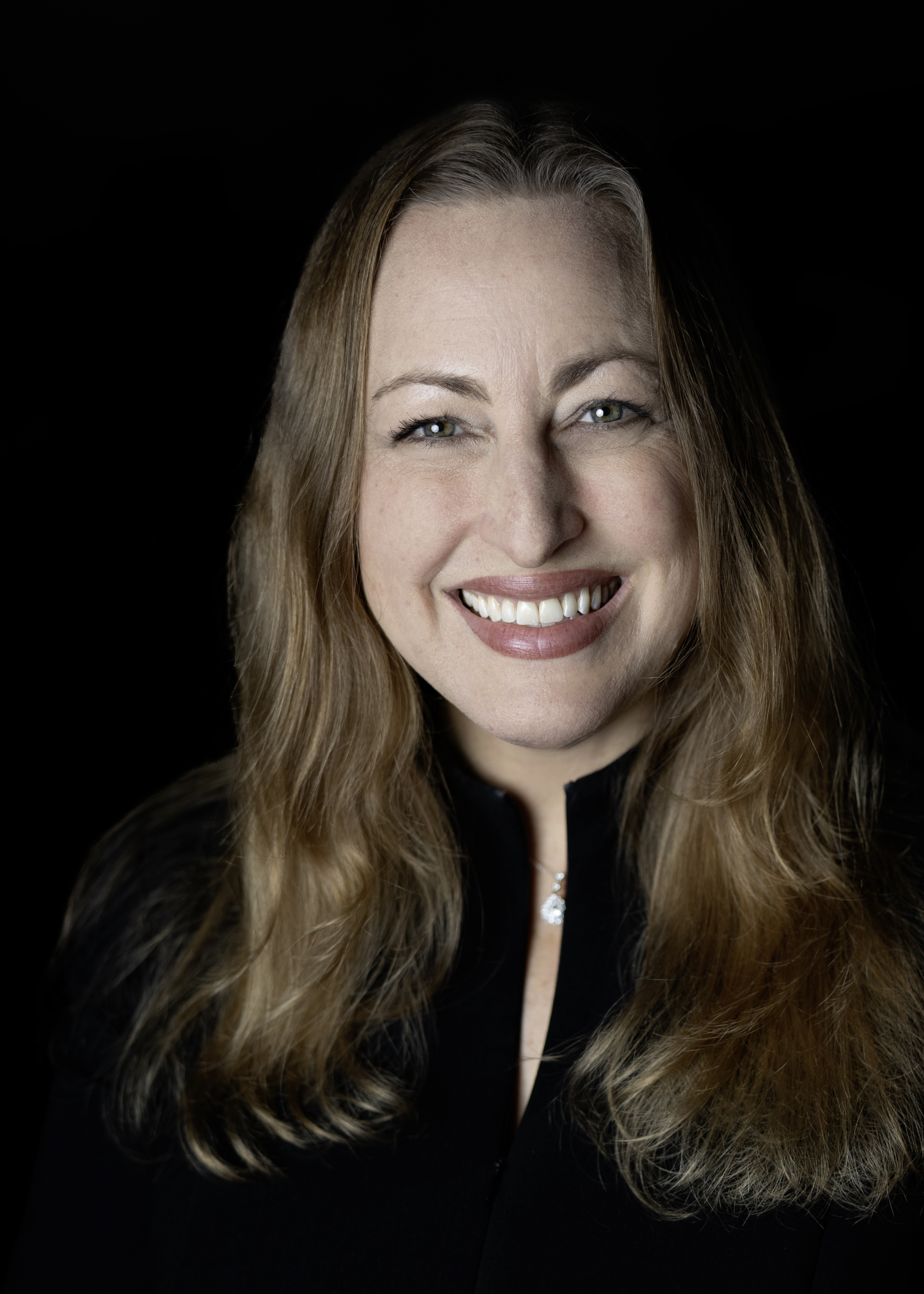
- Monje in 2025
- Born: 21 March 1978 (age 48); San Francisco, California
- Education: Vassar College; Stanford University
- Known for: Diffuse intrinsic pontine glioma
- Spouse: Karl Deisseroth
- Scientific career
- Workplaces: Stanford University
- Doctoral advisor: Philip A. Beachy
- Other academic advisors: Theo Palmer

Michelle Monje-Deisseroth is a neuroscientist and neuro-oncologist. She is a professor of neurology at Stanford University and an investigator with the Howard Hughes Medical Institute. Her research program focuses at the intersection of neuroscience, immunology and brain cancer biology with an emphasis on neuron-glial interactions in health and oncological disease. In addition to her fundamental neuroscience work on brain development and plasticity, she is widely credited for pioneering the field of Cancer Neuroscience. She develops new treatments for brain cancers such as diffuse intrinsic pontine glioma and other diffuse midline gliomas.

== Early life and education ==
Monje stated that her great-grandparents emigrated to New York City to flee from anti-Jewish violence in Eastern Europe at the beginning of the 20th century. She attended kindergarten at the Jewish Community Center and then moved to public schools. Monje wanted to be a physician from the age of five, when she was in kindergarten. She grew up in the San Francisco Bay Area and became interested in biology as a child. Monje was a figure skater during her childhood and taught figure skating to children with developmental disabilities whilst in Junior High. She was an undergraduate student at Vassar College. Monje studied medicine at Stanford University and earned her MD–PhD in 2004. She completed her internship at Stanford before leaving to join Harvard Medical School as a medical resident in neurology. Monje worked in the Brigham and Women's Hospital as well as the Massachusetts General Hospital. She completed a fellowship at the Stanford University School of Medicine, where she was mentored by Philip A. Beachy, and was board certified in neurology in 2008 and in neuro-oncology in 2013.

== Research ==
Her research considers the molecular mechanisms for neurodevelopment and neuroplasticity. She looks at how the neural circuits responsible for cognitive and motor functions are developed, and how the microenvironment of a tumour impacts the transition of precursor cells to diseased cells. She studies brainstem tumours as a paradigm for paediatric gliogenesis. Monje works at Stanford University, where she has developed new treatments for brain cancer since 2011. She has extensively investigated Diffuse Intrinsic Pontine Glioma (DIPG), a cancer for which it is difficult to identify effective chemotherapy and impossible to remove surgically, as the tumour grows in the brainstem. In 2009 she grew the first laboratory cultures of DIPG from deceased donors, which allowed her and her team to monitor the cell's growth and test chemotherapy agents. The tumour tissue resources developed in Monje's laboratory are shared with researchers all around the world. She also uses mouse models to test possible therapies.

Monje's research program focuses at the intersection of neuroscience, immunology and cancer biology. Her laboratory studies how neuronal activity regulates healthy glial precursor cell proliferation, new oligodendrocyte generation, and adaptive myelination; this plasticity of myelin contributes to healthy cognitive function, while disruption of myelin plasticity contributes to cognitive impairment in disease states like cancer therapy-related cognitive impairment. Her lab discovered that neuronal activity similarly promotes the progression of malignant gliomas, driving glioma growth through both paracrine factors and through electrophysiologically functional neuron-to-glioma synapses. Together with her former mentee Humsa Venkatesh, Monje also discovered that small cell lung cancer brain metastases similarly form bona fide synapses with neurons and are driven by neuronal activity.

Monje has led several of her discoveries from basic molecular discoveries to clinical trials. Monje led a Phase 1 clinical trial of panobinostat, a drug which slows the growth of DIPG and has been shown to increase survival rates in mice. She has also leveraged engineered immune cells called chimeric antigen receptor T (CAR-T) cells to eradicate brain tumours. This work involved screening DIPG tumour cultures for surface molecules that could be targets for CAR-T cells. Monje found that GD2 is present on the surface of 80% of DIPG tumours. Over expression of the sugar molecule GD2 is caused by the H3K27M mutation, which drives the growth of tumour. Crystal Mackall developed CAR-T cells that attack the GD2. Working together, Monje and Mackall discovered that GD2-CAR T cells kill cultured DIPG cells which carry the H3K27M mutation. Monje's engineered cells can cross the blood–brain barrier, and have been shown to greatly reduce the number of cancer cells in mice. She has led a Phase I clinical trial (NCT04196413) of GD2-CAR T cells for children and young adults with DIPG and other diffuse midline gliomas that has shown promise in early reports.

She was board certified by the American Board of Psychiatry and Neurology in Neurology in 2018. She was recognised by State senator Jerry Hill with a Certificate of Recognition in June 2019. The campaigning and research of Monje resulted in the United States renaming May 17 as Paediatric Brain Cancer Awareness Day. In addition to numerous federal and private foundation grants, her research is supported by family members of children who have suffered from DIPG. Monje serves on the advisory board of Abbie's Army and ChadTough Defeat DIPG Foundation, non-profits that fight for a cure for DIPG.

Monje's work has led to a new recognition of the important roles that the nervous system plays in cancer and has been foundational for the new field of Cancer Neuroscience.

== Personal life ==
As of 2022, Monje was married to Nobel laureate neuroscientist Karl Deisseroth, with whom she has four children.

== Awards and honors ==
Her work pioneering the field of Cancer Neuroscience has been recognized with numerous honors, including an NIH Director's Pioneer Award, the 2019 Presidential Early Career Award for Scientists and Engineers a MacArthur Fellowship, the 2023 Paul Marks Prize, the 2023 Richard Lounsbery Award, the 2024 Ross Prize in Molecular Medicine, the 2025 Prize in Translational Neuroscience from the Max Planck Society, the 2025 Brain Prize, and election to the National Academy of Sciences and National Academy of Medicine.

- 2025 Member, National Academy of Sciences
- 2025 Brain Prize
- 2025 International Prize in Translational Neuroscience from the Max Planck Society
- 2024 Ross Prize in Molecular Medicine
- 2023 Paul Marks Prize in Cancer Research
- 2023 Richard Lounsbery Award
- 2021 MacArthur Fellowship
- 2021 Member, National Academy of Medicine
- 2019 Presidential Early Career Award for Scientists and Engineers
- 2017 Neuro-Oncology Investigator Award, American Academy of Neurology

== Selected publications ==
- Monje, Michelle (2003). "Inflammatory blockade restores adult hippocampal neurogenesis". Science. 302 (5651): 1760–1765. Bibcode:2003Sci...302.1760M. doi:10.1126/science.1088417. PMID 14615545. S2CID 36806485.
- Monje, Michelle (2002). "Irradiation induces neural precursor-cell dysfunction". Nature Medicine. 8 (9): 955–962. doi:10.1038/nm749. PMID 12161748. S2CID 10347561.
- Monje, Michelle (April 2003). "Radiation injury and neurogenesis". Current Opinion in Neurology. 16 (2): 129–134. doi:10.1097/00019052-200304000-00002. PMID 12644738.
- Gibson EM, Purger D, Mount CW, Goldstein AK, Lin GL, Inema I, Miller SE, Bieri G, Zuchero JB, Barres BA, Woo PJ, Vogel H, Monje M (2014) Neuronal activity promotes adaptive oligodendrogenesis and myelination in the mammalian brain. Science, 344 (6183):487; 344:1252304 PMID 24727982
- Venkatesh HS, Johung T, Caretti V, Noll A, Tang Y, Nagaraja S, Gibson EM, Mount CW, Pollepalli J, Mitra SS, Woo PJ, Malenka RM, Vogel H, Bredel M, Mallick P, Monje M (2015) Neuronal activity promotes glioma growth through neuroligin-3 secretion, Cell, 161(4):803-16 PMID 25913192
- Monje M. (July 2018). "Myelin plasticity and nervous system function". Annu Rev Neurosci. 8 (41):61-76. Annu Rev Neurosci. doi: 10.1146/annurev-neuro-080317-061853.
- Gibson E.M., Nagaraja S., Ocampo A, Tam L.T., Wood L.S., Pallegar P.N., Greene J.J., Geraghty A.C., Goldstein A.K., Ni. L., Woo P.J., Barres B.A., Liddelow S., Vogel H., Monje M. (2019) Methotrexate chemotherapy induces persistent tri-glial dysregulation that underlies chemotherapy-related cognitive impairment, Cell, 176 (1), 43–55.
- Geraghty A.C., Gibson E.M., Reem G., Greene J., Ocampo A., Goldstein A.K., Ni L., Yang T., Marton R.M., Pasca S.P., Greenberg M.E., Longo F.M., Monje M. (2019) Loss of adaptive myelination contributes to methotrexate chemotherapy-related cognitive impairment. Neuron, 103(2):250-265
- Venkatesh HS, Morishita W, Geraghty AC, Silverbush D, Gillespie SM, Arzt M, Tam LT, Espenel C, Ponnuswami A, Ni L, Woo PJ, Taylor KR, Agarwal A, Regev A, Brang D, Vogel H, Hervey-Jumper S, Bergles DE, Suvà ML, Malenka RC and Monje M (2019) Electrical and synaptic integration of glioma into neural circuits Nature 573: 539-545
- Pan Y, Hysinger JD, Barron T, Schindler NF, Cobb O, Guo X, Yalcin B, Anastasaki C, Mulinyawe SB, Ponnuswami A, Schaeffer S, Ma Y, Chang K-C, Toonen JA, Lennon JJ, Gibson EM, Huguenard JR, Liau LM, Goldberg J, Monje M*, Gutmann DH* (2021) NF1 mutation drives neuronal activity-dependent optic glioma initiation. Nature. 594(7862):277-282
- Fernandez-Castaneda, A., Lu, P., Geraghty, A.C., Song, E., Lee, M.H., Wood, J., O'Dea, M.R., Dutton, S., Shamardani, K., Nwangwu, K., Mancusi R, Yalçın B, Taylor KR, Acosta-Alvarez L, Malacon K, Keough MB, Ni L, Woo PJ, Contreras-Esquivel D, Toland AMS, Gehlhausen JR, Klein J, Takahashi T, Silva J, Israelow B, Lucas C, Mao T, Peña-Hernández MA, Tabachnikova A, Homer RJ, Tabacof L, Tosto-Mancuso J, Breyman E, Kontorovich A, McCarthy D, Quezada M, Vogel H, Hefti MM, Perl DP, Liddelow S, Folkerth R, Putrino D, Nath A., Iwasaki A.*, Monje M.* (2022). Mild respiratory COVID can cause multi-lineage neural cell and myelin dysregulation. Cell. 185(14):2452-2468 10.1016/j.cell.2022.06.008.
- Taylor, KR, Barron T, Hui A, Spitzer A, Yalcin B, Ivec AE, Geraghty AC, Hartmann, Arzt M, Gillespie S, Ni L, Zhang H, Venkatesh HS, Du P, Mancusi R, Chau IJ, Ponnuswami A, Aziz-Bose R, Tirosh I, Suva ML, Monje M (2023) Glioma synapses recruit mechanisms of adaptive plasticity, Nature 623, 366–374
- Yalçın, B., Pomrenze, M.B., Malacon, K., Chau, I.J., Taylor, K.R., Ni, L., Contreras-Esquivel, D., Malenka, R.C., and Monje, M. (2024) Myelin plasticity in the ventral tegmental area is required for opioid reward. Nature 630, 677-685
- Barron, T., Yalcin, B., Su, M., Byun, Y.G., Gavish, A., Shamardani, K., Xu, H., Ni, L., Soni, N., Mehta, V., Maleki Jahan, S., Kim, Y.S., Taylor, K.R., Keough, M.B., Quezada, M.A., Geraghty, A.C., Mancusi, R., Vo, L.T., Castaneda, E.H., Woo, P.J., Petritsch, C.K., Vogel, H., Kaila, K., and Monje, M. (2025). GABAergic neuron-to-glioma synapses in diffuse midline gliomas. Nature. 639(8056): 1060-1068
- Geraghty AC, Acosta-Alvarez L, Rotiroti MC, Dutton S, O'Dea MR, Kim W, Trivedi V, Mancusi R, Shamardani K, Malacon K, Woo PJ, Martinez-Velez N, Pham T, Reche-Ley NN, Otubu G, Castenada EH, Nwangwu K, Xu H, Mulinyawe SB, Zamler DB, Ni L, Cross K, Rustenhoven J, Kipnis J, Liddelow SA, Mackall CL, Majzner RG, Monje M.(2025) Immunotherapy-related cognitive impairment after CAR T cell therapy in mice. Cell. 188(12):3238-3258. PMID 40359942
- Drexler R, Drinnenberg A, Gavish A, Yalçin B, Shamardani K, Rogers AE, Mancusi R, Trivedi V, Taylor KR, Kim YS, Woo PJ, Soni N, Su M, Ravel A, Tatlock E, Midler A, Wu SH, Ramakrishnan C, Chen R, Ayala-Sarmiento AE, Fernandez Pacheco DR, Siverts L, Daigle TL, Tasic B, Zeng H, Breunig JJ, Deisseroth K, Monje M. Cholinergic neuronal activity promotes diffuse midline glioma growth through muscarinic signaling. Cell. 2025 Aug 21;188(17):4640-4657.e30. doi: 10.1016/j.cell.2025.05.031. PMID 40541184.
- Savchuk S, Gentry KM, Wang W, Carleton E, Biagi-Junior CAO, Luthria K, Yalçın B, Ni L, Farnsworth HC, Davis RA, Drexler R, Melms JC, Liu Y, Acosta-Alvarez L, Hartmann GG, Pavarino EC, LaBelle J, Woo PJ, Toland AM, Qu F, Kim YS, Filbin MG, Krasnow MA, Ligon KL, Izar B, Sage J, Sabatini BL, Monje M*, Venkatesh HS* (2025). Neuronal-Activity Dependent Mechanisms of Small Cell Lung Cancer Pathogenesis. Nature 646(8087):1232-1242. doi: 10.1038/s41586-025-09492-z. PMID 40931074
