= Jervine =

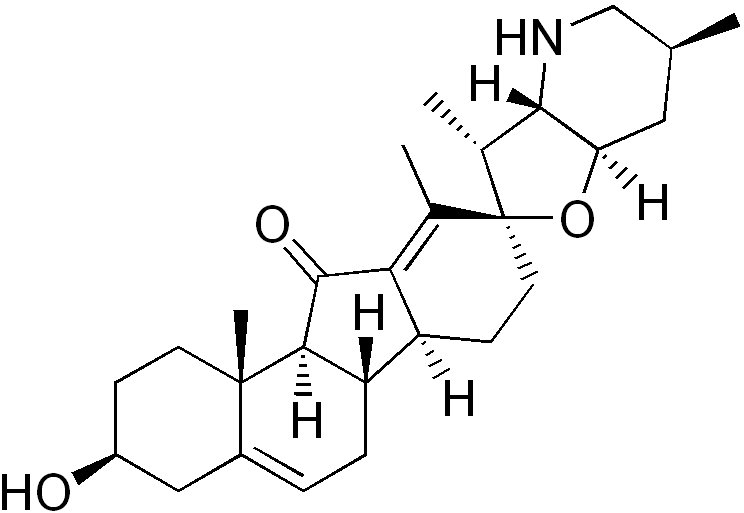

Names
- IUPAC name 3β-Hydroxy-17β,23β-epoxyveratraman-11-one
- Systematic IUPAC name (2′R,3S,3′R,3′aS,6′S,6aS,6bS,7′aR,11aS,11bR)-3-Hydroxy-3′,6′,10,11b-tetramethyl-2,3,3′a,4,4′,5′,6,6′,6a,6b,7,7′,7′a,8,11a,11b-hexadecahydro-3′H-spiro[benzo[a]fluorene-9,2′-furo[3,2-b]pyridin]-11(1H)-one
- Other names (3β,23β)-17,23-Epoxy-3-hydroxyveratraman-11-one

Identifiers
CAS Number	469-59-0
3D model (JSmol)	Interactive image
ChEBI	CHEBI:6088
ChEMBL	ChEMBL186779
ChemSpider	9694
ECHA InfoCard	100.006.745
PubChem CID	10098
UNII	19V3ECX465
CompTox Dashboard (EPA)	DTXSID70895026
- InChI: InChI=1S/C27H39NO3/c1-14-11-21-24(28-13-14)16(3)27(31-21)10-8-19-20-6-5-17-12-18(29)7-9-26(17,4)23(20)25(30)22(19)15(27)2/h5,14,16,18-21,23-24,28-29H,6-13H2,1-4H3/t14-,16+,18-,19-,20-,21+,23+,24-,26-,27-/m0/s1 Key: CLEXYFLHGFJONT-DNMILWOZSA-N; InChI=1/C27H39NO3/c1-14-11-21-24(28-13-14)16(3)27(31-21)10-8-19-20-6-5-17-12-18(29)7-9-26(17,4)23(20)25(30)22(19)15(27)2/h5,14,16,18-21,23-24,28-29H,6-13H2,1-4H3/t14-,16+,18-,19-,20-,21+,23+,24-,26-,27-/m0/s1 Key: CLEXYFLHGFJONT-DNMILWOZBJ
- SMILES: O=C5/C3=C(/[C@@]1(O[C@@H]2C[C@@H](CN[C@H]2[C@H]1C)C)CC[C@H]3[C@@H]6C/C=C4/C[C@@H](O)CC[C@]4(C)[C@@H]56)C

Properties
Chemical formula	C_{27}H_{39}NO_{3}
Molar mass	425.60 g/mol
Solubility	10 mg/mL in EtOH; 6 mg/mL in DMF
- Except where otherwise noted, data are given for materials in their standard state (at 25 °C [77 °F], 100 kPa). verify (what is ?) Infobox references

Jervine is a steroidal alkaloid with molecular formula C_{27}H_{39}NO_{3} which is derived from the plant genus Veratrum. Similar to cyclopamine, which also occurs in the genus Veratrum, it is a teratogen implicated in birth defects when consumed by animals during a certain period of their gestation.

== Physiological effects ==
Jervine is a potent teratogen causing birth defects in vertebrates. In severe cases it can cause cyclopia and holoprosencephaly.

== Mechanism of action ==
Jervine's biological activity is mediated via its interaction with the 7 pass trans membrane protein smoothened. Jervine binds with and inhibits smoothened, which is an integral part of the hedgehog signaling pathways. With smoothened inhibited, the GLI1 transcription cannot be activated and hedgehog target genes cannot be transcribed.
