= Veratramine =

Names
- IUPAC name (23R)-14,15,16,17-Tetradehydroveratraman-3β,23-diol
- Systematic IUPAC name (2S,3R,5S)-2-{(1S)-1-[(3S,6aR,11aS,11bR)-10,11b-Dimethyl-2,3,4,6,6a,11,11a,11b-octahydro-1H-benzo[a]fluoren-9-yl]ethyl}-5-methylpiperidin-3-ol

Identifiers
CAS Number	60-70-8
3D model (JSmol)	Interactive image
ChEBI	CHEBI:9951
ChemSpider	5845
ECHA InfoCard	100.208.611
KEGG	C10829
PubChem CID	6070
UNII	RK363YG315
CompTox Dashboard (EPA)	DTXSID40871534
- InChI: InChI=1S/C27H39NO2/c1-15-11-25(30)26(28-14-15)17(3)20-7-8-21-22-6-5-18-12-19(29)9-10-27(18,4)24(22)13-23(21)16(20)2/h5,7-8,15,17,19,22,24-26,28-30H,6,9-14H2,1-4H3/t15-,17-,19-,22-,24-,25+,26-,27-/m0/s1 Key: MALFODICFSIXPO-KFKQDBFTSA-N; InChI=1/C27H39NO2/c1-15-11-25(30)26(28-14-15)17(3)20-7-8-21-22-6-5-18-12-19(29)9-10-27(18,4)24(22)13-23(21)16(20)2/h5,7-8,15,17,19,22,24-26,28-30H,6,9-14H2,1-4H3/t15-,17-,19-,22-,24-,25+,26-,27-/m0/s1 Key: MALFODICFSIXPO-KFKQDBFTBV
- SMILES: Cc1c(ccc2c1C[C@H]3[C@H]2CC=C4[C@@]3(CC[C@@H](C4)O)C)[C@H](C)[C@H]5[C@@H](C[C@@H](CN5)C)O

Properties
Chemical formula	C_{27}H_{39}NO_{2}
Molar mass	409.614 g·mol^{−1}
- Except where otherwise noted, data are given for materials in their standard state (at 25 °C [77 °F], 100 kPa). Infobox references

Veratramine is an alkaloid isolated from the rhizomes of Veratrum.
