= Vismodegib =

Chemical compound

Clinical data
- Pronunciation: /ˌvɪsmoʊˈdɛɡɪb/ VIS-moh-DEG-ib
- Trade names: Erivedge
- Other names: GDC-0449, RG-3616
- AHFS/Drugs.com: Monograph
- License data: EU EMA: by INN; US FDA: Vismodegib
- Pregnancy category: AU: X (High risk)
- Routes of administration: By mouth
- ATC code: L01XJ01 (WHO)

Legal status
- Legal status: AU: S4 (Prescription only); CA: ℞-only; UK: POM (Prescription only); US: ℞-only; EU: Rx-only

Pharmacokinetic data
- Bioavailability: 31.8%
- Protein binding: >99%
- Metabolism: <2% metabolised by CYP2C9, CYP3A4, CYP3A5
- Elimination half-life: 4 days (continuous use), 12 days (single dose)
- Excretion: Fecal (82%), Urinary (4.4%)

Identifiers
- IUPAC name: 2-Chloro-N-(4-chloro-3-pyridin-2-ylphenyl)-4-methylsulfonylbenzamide
- CAS Number: 879085-55-9
- PubChem CID: 24776445
- IUPHAR/BPS: 6975
- DrugBank: DB08828
- ChemSpider: 23337846
- UNII: 25X868M3DS
- KEGG: D09992
- ChEBI: CHEBI:66903
- ChEMBL: ChEMBL473417
- CompTox Dashboard (EPA): DTXSID40236689
- ECHA InfoCard: 100.234.019

Chemical and physical data
- Formula: C_{19}H_{14}Cl_{2}N_{2}O_{3}S
- Molar mass: 421.29 g·mol^{−1}
- 3D model (JSmol): Interactive image
- SMILES: CS(=O)(=O)C1=CC(=C(C=C1)C(=O)NC2=CC(=C(C=C2)Cl)C3=CC=CC=N3)Cl
- InChI: InChI=1S/C19H14Cl2N2O3S/c1-27(25,26)13-6-7-14(17(21)11-13)19(24)23-12-5-8-16(20)15(10-12)18-4-2-3-9-22-18/h2-11H,1H3,(H,23,24); Key:BPQMGSKTAYIVFO-UHFFFAOYSA-N

Vismodegib, sold under the brand name Erivedge, is a medication used for the treatment of basal-cell carcinoma (BCC). The approval of vismodegib on January 30, 2012, represents the first Hedgehog signaling pathway targeting agent to gain U.S. Food and Drug Administration (FDA) approval. The drug is also undergoing clinical trials for metastatic colorectal cancer, small-cell lung cancer, advanced stomach cancer, pancreatic cancer, medulloblastoma and chondrosarcoma as of June 2011. The drug was developed by the biotechnology/pharmaceutical company Genentech.

== Indication ==
Vismodegib is indicated for people with basal-cell carcinoma (BCC) which has metastasized to other parts of the body, relapsed after surgery, or cannot be treated with surgery or radiation.

== Mechanism of action ==
The substance acts as a cyclopamine-competitive antagonist of the smoothened receptor (SMO) which is part of the Hedgehog signaling pathway. SMO inhibition causes the transcription factors GLI1 and GLI2 to remain inactive, which prevents the expression of tumor mediating genes within the hedgehog pathway. This pathway is pathogenetically relevant in more than 90% of basal-cell carcinomas.

== Side effects ==
In clinical trials, common side effects included gastrointestinal disorders (nausea, vomiting, diarrhoea, constipation), muscle spasms, fatigue, hair loss, and dysgeusia (distortion of the sense of taste).

== Development ==
Vismodegib has undergone several promising phase I and phase II clinical trials for its use in treating medulloblastoma.
