= GLI2 =

Protein-coding gene in the species Homo sapiens

Identifiers
- Aliases: GLI2, CJS, HPE9, PHS2, THP1, THP2, GLI family zinc finger 2
- External IDs: OMIM: 165230; MGI: 95728; GeneCards: GLI2

Gene location (Human)
Chr.	Chromosome 2 (human)
Band	2q14.2	Start	120,735,623 bp
Band	2q14.2	End	120,992,653 bp

Gene location (Mouse)
Chr.	Chromosome 1 (mouse)
Band	1 E2.3|1 52.17 cM	Start	118,761,862 bp
Band	1 E2.3|1 52.17 cM	End	118,981,349 bp
RNA expression pattern
Bgee	Human / Mouse (ortholog); Top expressed in: tibia; germinal epithelium; ventricular zone; saphenous vein; stromal cell of endometrium; ganglionic eminence; endothelial cell; gonad; right ovary; left ovary / Top expressed in: spermatogonium; dermis; vas deferens; abdominal wall; external carotid artery; genital tubercle; internal carotid artery; condyle; otic vesicle; saccule; More reference expression data
BioGPS	n/a
Gene ontology
Molecular function	DNA-binding transcription factor activity; DNA-binding transcription activator activity, RNA polymerase II-specific; metal ion binding; RNA polymerase II cis-regulatory region sequence-specific DNA binding; zinc ion binding; chromatin binding; protein binding; nucleic acid binding; sequence-specific DNA binding; DNA binding; transcription factor binding; promoter-specific chromatin binding; DNA-binding transcription factor activity, RNA polymerase II-specific
Cellular component	cytoplasm; cytosol; membrane; nucleus; nuclear speck; axoneme; nucleoplasm; ciliary base; ciliary tip; nucleolus; motile cilium; cilium; cell projection
Biological process	pattern specification process; skeletal system development; smoothened signaling pathway involved in ventral spinal cord interneuron specification; notochord regression; anatomical structure formation involved in morphogenesis; hindgut morphogenesis; spinal cord dorsal/ventral patterning; transcription by RNA polymerase II; mammary gland development; odontogenesis of dentin-containing tooth; prostatic bud formation; negative regulation of chondrocyte differentiation; cerebellar cortex morphogenesis; cell population proliferation; spinal cord ventral commissure morphogenesis; cellular response to virus; floor plate formation; regulation of transcription, DNA-templated; kidney development; lung development; tube development; response to mechanical stimulus; embryonic digit morphogenesis; head development; neuron development; in utero embryonic development; transcription, DNA-templated; mammary gland duct morphogenesis; positive regulation of transcription, DNA-templated; morphogenesis of an epithelium; ventral midline development; development of the heart; positive regulation of neuron differentiation; neural tube development; smoothened signaling pathway; spinal cord motor neuron differentiation; epidermal cell differentiation; proximal/distal pattern formation; cell differentiation; positive regulation of T cell differentiation in thymus; chondrocyte differentiation; anatomical structure development; smoothened signaling pathway involved in regulation of cerebellar granule cell precursor cell proliferation; cellular response to organic cyclic compound; negative regulation of apoptotic process; negative regulation of transcription by RNA polymerase II; positive regulation of DNA replication; developmental growth; osteoblast differentiation; osteoblast development; dorsal/ventral neural tube patterning; dorsal/ventral pattern formation; branching morphogenesis of an epithelial tube; embryonic digestive tract development; pituitary gland development; hindbrain development; ventral spinal cord development; axon guidance; multicellular organism development; regulation of smoothened signaling pathway; smoothened signaling pathway involved in dorsal/ventral neural tube patterning; smoothened signaling pathway involved in spinal cord motor neuron cell fate specification; cochlea morphogenesis; positive regulation of cell population proliferation; anterior/posterior pattern specification; positive regulation of transcription by RNA polymerase II; prostate gland development
Sources:Amigo / QuickGO
Orthologs
Databases	NCBI: entry; OMA: entry
Species	Human	Mouse
Entrez	2736	14633
Ensembl	ENSG00000074047	ENSMUSG00000048402
UniProt	P10070	Q0VGT2
RefSeq (mRNA)	NM_005270; NM_030379; NM_030380; NM_030381; NM_001371271 NM_001374353; NM_001374354	NM_001081125
RefSeq (protein)	NP_005261; NP_001358200; NP_001361282; NP_001361283	NP_001074594
Location (UCSC)	Chr 2: 120.74 – 120.99 Mb	Chr 1: 118.76 – 118.98 Mb
PubMed search
- Wikidata
View/Edit Human	View/Edit Mouse

Zinc finger protein GLI2 also known as GLI family zinc finger 2 is a protein that in humans is encoded by the GLI2 gene. The protein encoded by this gene is a transcription factor.

GLI2 belongs to the C2H2-type zinc finger protein subclass of the Gli family. Members of this subclass are characterized as transcription factors which bind DNA through zinc finger motifs. These motifs contain conserved H-C links. Gli family zinc finger proteins are mediators of Sonic hedgehog (Shh) signaling and they are implicated as potent oncogenes in the embryonal carcinoma cell. The protein encoded by this gene localizes to the cytoplasm and activates patched Drosophila homolog (PTCH) gene expression. It is also thought to play a role during embryogenesis.

== Isoforms ==
There are four isoforms: Gli2 alpha, beta, gamma and delta.

== Structure ==
C-terminal activator and N-terminal repressor regions have been identified in both Gli2 and Gli3. However, the N-terminal part of human Gli2 is much smaller than its mouse or frog homologs, suggesting that it may lack repressor function.

== Function ==
Gli2 affects ventroposterior mesodermal development by regulating at least three different genes; Wnt genes involved in morphogenesis, Brachyury genes involved in tissue specification and Xhox3 genes involved in positional information. The anti-apoptotic protein BCL-2 is up regulated by Gli2 and, to a lesser extent, Gli1 – but not Gli3, which may lead to carcinogenesis. Additionally, in the amphibian model organism Xenopus laevis, it has been shown that Gli2 plays a key role in the induction, specification, migration and differentiation of the neural crest. In this context, Gli2 is responding to the Indian Hedgehog signaling pathway.

It has been shown in mouse models that Gli1 can compensate for knocked out Gli2 function when expressed from the Gli2 locus. This suggests that in mouse embryogenesis, Gli1 and Gli2 regulate a similar set of target genes. Mutations do develop later in development suggesting Gli1/Gli2 transcriptional regulation is context dependent. Gli2 and Gli3 are important in the formation and development of lung, trachea and oesophagus tissue during embryo development. Studies have also shown that GLI2 plays a dual role as activator of keratinocyte proliferation and repressor of epidermal differentiation. There is a significant level of crosstalk and functional overlap between the Gli TFs. Gli2 has been shown to compensate for the loss of Gli1 in transgenic Gli1-/- mice which are phenotypically normal. However, loss of Gli3 leads to abnormal patterning and loss of Gli2 affects the development of ventral cell types, most significantly in the floor plate. Gli2 has been shown to compensate for Gli1 ventrally and Gli3 dorsally in transgenic mice. Gli2 null mice embryos develop neural tube defects which, can be rescued by overexpression of Gli1 (Jacob and Briscoe, 2003). Gli1 has been shown to induce the two GLI2 α/β isoforms.

Transgenic double homozygous Gli1-/- and Gli2-/- knockout mice display serious central nervous system and lung defects have small lungs, undescended testes, and a hopping gait as well as an extra postaxial nubbin on the limbs. Gli2-/- and Gli3-/- double homozygous transgenic mice are not viable and do not survive beyond embryonic level. These studies suggest overlapping roles for Gli1 with Gli2 and Gli2 with Gli3 in embryonic development.

Transgenic Gli1-/- and Gli2-/- mice have a similar phenotype to transgenic Gli1 gain of function mice. This phenotype includes failure to thrive, early death, and a distended gut although no tumors form in transgenic Gli1-/- and Gli2-/- mice. This could suggest that overexpression of human Gli1 in the mouse may have led to a dominant negative rather than a gain-of-function phenotype.

Transgenic mice over-expressing the transcription factor Gli2 under the K5 promoter in cutaneous keratinocytes develop multiple skin tumours on the ears, tail, trunk and dorsal aspect of the paw, resembling those of basal cell carcinoma (BCC). Unlike Gli1 transgenic mice, Gli2 transgenic mice only developed BCC-like tumors. Transgenic mice with N-terminal deletion of Gli2, developed the benign trichoblastomas, cylindromas and hamartomas but rarely developed BCCs. Gli2 is expressed in the interfollicular epidermis and the outer root sheath of hair follicles in normal human skin. This is significant as Shh regulates hair follicle growth and morphogenesis. When inappropriately activated causes hair follicle derived tumors, the most clinically significant being the BCC.

Of the four Gli2 isoforms the expression of Gli2beta mRNA was increased the most in BCCs. Gli2beta is an isoform spliced at the first splicing site which contains a repression domain and consists of an intact activation domain. Overexpression of this Gli2 splice variant may lead to the upregulation of the Shh signalling pathway, thereby inducing BCCs.

== Clinical significance ==
Mutations of the GLI2 gene are associated with midline craniofacial anomalies, hypopituitarism, and sometimes holoprosencephaly (https://omim.org/entry/165230, Holoprosencephaly 9, Culler-Jones syndrome)

In human keratinocytes Gli2 activation upregulates a number of genes involved in cell cycle progression including E2F1, CCND1, CDC2 and CDC45L. Gli2 is able to induce G1–S phase progression in contact-inhibited keratinocytes which may drive tumour development.

Although both Gli1 and Gl12 have been implicated it is unclear whether one or both are needed for carcinogenesis. However, due to feed back loops, one may directly or indirectly induce the other.

== Cis-regulatory catalog of GLI2 ==
Minhas et al. 2015 have recently elucidated a subset of cis-regulatory elements controlling GLI2 expression. They have shown that conserved non-coding elements (CNEs) from the intron of GLI2 gene act as tissue-specific enhancers and reporter gene expression induced by these elements correlates with previously reported endogenous gli2 expression in zebrafish. The regulatory activities of these elements are observed in several embryonic domains, including neural tube and pectoral fin.
