= PTCH1 =

Protein-coding gene in the species Homo sapiens

Identifiers
- Aliases: PTCH1, BCNS, HPE7, NBCCS, PTC, PTC1, PTCH, PTCH11, patched 1
- External IDs: OMIM: 601309; MGI: 105373; GeneCards: PTCH1

Gene location (Human)
Chr.	Chromosome 9 (human)
Band	9q22.32	Start	95,442,980 bp
Band	9q22.32	End	95,517,057 bp

Gene location (Mouse)
Chr.	Chromosome 13 (mouse)
Band	13 B3|13 32.8 cM	Start	63,656,142 bp
Band	13 B3|13 32.8 cM	End	63,721,412 bp
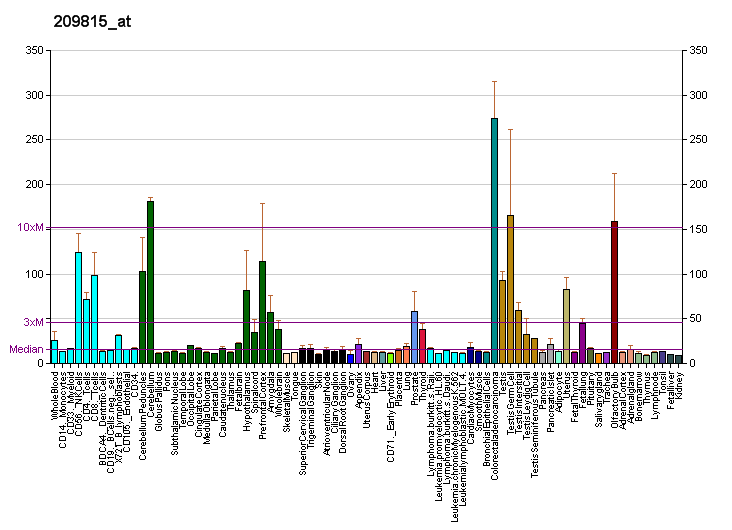

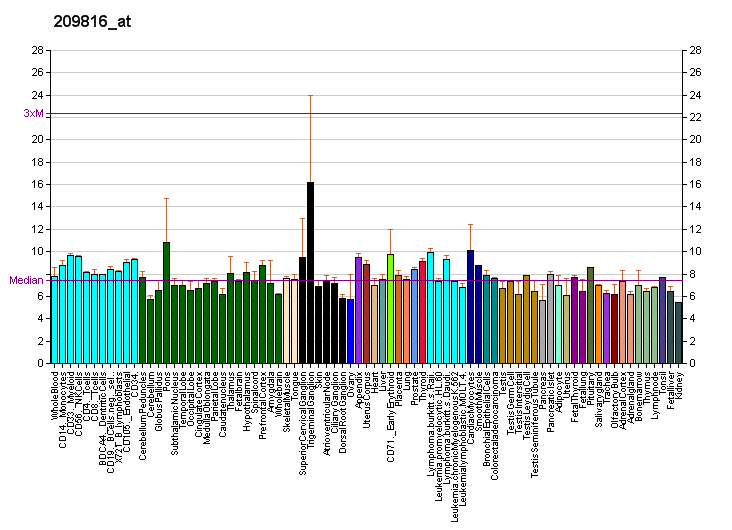

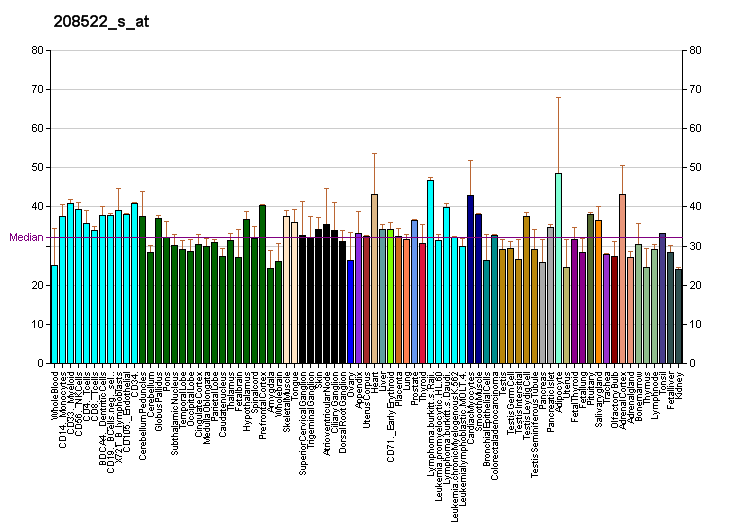
RNA expression pattern
Bgee	Human / Mouse (ortholog); Top expressed in: tibia; spinal ganglia; trigeminal ganglion; sural nerve; pylorus; sperm; retinal pigment epithelium; cardia; internal globus pallidus; endometrium / Top expressed in: upper jaw; Gonadal ridge; tooth; molar; vas deferens; migratory enteric neural crest cell; lobe of cerebellum; sciatic nerve; hair follicle; dermis; More reference expression data
BioGPS	More reference expression data
Gene ontology
Molecular function	heparin binding; smoothened binding; cholesterol binding; patched binding; protein binding; hedgehog receptor activity; hedgehog family protein binding; cyclin binding; protein-containing complex binding
Cellular component	integral component of membrane; endocytic vesicle membrane; dendritic growth cone; Golgi apparatus; intracellular membrane-bounded organelle; postsynaptic density; membrane; plasma membrane; axonal growth cone; midbody; ciliary membrane; perinuclear region of cytoplasm; caveola; cilium; nucleus
Biological process	pattern specification process; renal system development; neural plate axis specification; response to estradiol; limb morphogenesis; negative regulation of smoothened signaling pathway; response to organic cyclic compound; response to retinoic acid; glucose homeostasis; embryonic organ development; cell proliferation involved in metanephros development; negative regulation of multicellular organism growth; protein processing; response to mechanical stimulus; heart morphogenesis; epidermal cell fate specification; in utero embryonic development; negative regulation of transcription by RNA polymerase II; hindlimb morphogenesis; negative regulation of DNA-binding transcription factor activity; negative regulation of osteoblast differentiation; mammary gland epithelial cell differentiation; somite development; cellular response to cholesterol; regulation of protein localization; positive regulation of transcription, DNA-templated; mammary gland duct morphogenesis; mammary gland development; neural tube patterning; regulation of smoothened signaling pathway; branching involved in ureteric bud morphogenesis; neural tube closure; brain development; keratinocyte proliferation; negative regulation of cell division; smoothened signaling pathway involved in dorsal/ventral neural tube patterning; regulation of cell population proliferation; embryonic limb morphogenesis; positive regulation of cholesterol efflux; regulation of mitotic cell cycle; negative regulation of epithelial cell proliferation; epidermis development; animal organ morphogenesis; cell differentiation involved in kidney development; cell fate determination; response to chlorate; regulation of growth; smoothened signaling pathway; dorsal/ventral neural tube patterning; spinal cord motor neuron differentiation; negative regulation of transcription, DNA-templated; positive regulation of epidermal cell differentiation; dorsal/ventral pattern formation; neural tube formation; signal transduction; negative regulation of cell population proliferation; pharyngeal system development; prostate gland development; commissural neuron axon guidance; protein localization to plasma membrane; liver regeneration
Sources:Amigo / QuickGO
Orthologs
Databases	NCBI: entry; OMA: entry
Species	Human	Mouse
Entrez	5727	19206
Ensembl	ENSG00000185920	ENSMUSG00000021466
UniProt	Q13635	Q61115
RefSeq (mRNA)	NM_000264; NM_001083602; NM_001083603; NM_001083604; NM_001083605 NM_001083606; NM_001083607; NM_001354918; NM_001354919	NM_008957; NM_001328514
RefSeq (protein)	NP_000255; NP_001077071; NP_001077072; NP_001077073; NP_001077074 NP_001077075; NP_001077076; NP_001341847; NP_001341848	NP_001315443; NP_032983
Location (UCSC)	Chr 9: 95.44 – 95.52 Mb	Chr 13: 63.66 – 63.72 Mb
PubMed search
- Wikidata
View/Edit Human	View/Edit Mouse

Protein patched homolog 1 is a protein that is the member of the patched family and in humans is encoded by the PTCH1 gene.

== Function ==
PTCH1 is a member of the patched gene family and is the receptor for sonic hedgehog, a secreted molecule implicated in the formation of embryonic structures and in tumorigenesis. This gene functions as a tumor suppressor. The PTCH1 gene product, is a transmembrane protein that suppresses the release of another protein called smoothened, and when sonic hedgehog binds PTCH1, smoothened is released and signals cell proliferation.

== Clinical significance ==
Mutations of this gene have been associated with nevoid basal cell carcinoma syndrome (AKA Gorlin's Syndrome), esophageal squamous cell carcinoma, trichoepitheliomas, transitional cell carcinomas of the bladder, as well as holoprosencephaly. Alternative splicing results in multiple transcript variants encoding different isoforms. Additional splice variants have been described, but their full length sequences and biological validity cannot be determined currently.

Mutations in PTCH1 cause Gorlin syndrome and mutations have also been found in holoprosencephaly patients. Some of these patients present cleft lip and palate among the holoprosencephaly features, and missense variants in PTCH1 were also found in a sequencing screening of nonsyndromic cleft lip and palate patients. In addition association between SNPs in or near PTCH1 have been found to be associated with nonsyndromic cleft lip and palate. Mutations in PTCH1 are also associated with medulloblastoma.
