= Hedgehog signaling pathway =

Embryonic signaling pathway for proper cell differentiation

Protein hedgehog

Identifiers
- Organism: Drosophila melanogaster
- Symbol: hh
- Orthologs: OMA: entry
- UniProt: Q02936
Search for
- Structures: Swiss-model
- Domains: InterPro

Hedge N-terminal signal

Identifiers
- Symbol: HH_signal
- Pfam: PF01085
- InterPro: IPR000320
- CATH: 3d1m
- SCOP2: 3d1m / SCOPe / SUPFAM
Available protein structures:
- PDB: IPR000320 PF01085 (ECOD; PDBsum)
- AlphaFold: IPR000320; PF01085

The Hedgehog signaling pathway is a signaling pathway that transmits information to embryonic cells required for proper cell differentiation. Different parts of the embryo have different concentrations of hedgehog signaling proteins. The pathway also has roles in the adult diseases associated with the malfunction of this pathway include cancer.

The Hedgehog signaling pathway is one of the key regulators of animal development and is present in all bilaterians. The pathway takes its name from its polypeptide ligand, an intracellular signaling molecule called Hedgehog (Hh) found in fruit flies of the genus Drosophila; fruit fly larvae lacking the Hh gene are said to resemble hedgehogs. Hh is one of Drosophila's segment polarity gene products, involved in establishing the basis of the fly body plan. The molecule remains important during later stages of embryogenesis and metamorphosis.

Mammals have three Hedgehog homologues, Desert (DHH), Indian (IHH), and Sonic (SHH), of which Sonic is the best studied. The pathway is equally important during vertebrate embryonic development and is therefore of interest in evolutionary developmental biology. In knockout mice lacking components of the pathway, the brain, skeleton, musculature, gastrointestinal tract and lungs fail to develop correctly. Recent studies point to the role of Hedgehog signaling in regulating adult stem cells involved in maintenance and regeneration of adult tissues. The pathway has also been implicated in the development of some cancers. Drugs that specifically target Hedgehog signaling to fight this disease are being actively developed by a number of pharmaceutical companies.

== Discovery ==
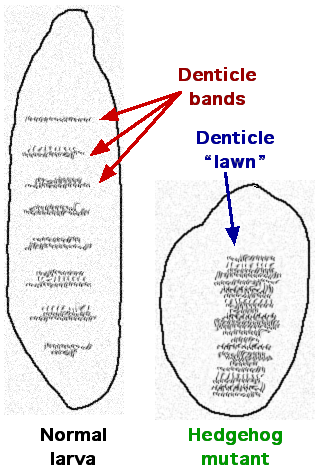
Figure 1. Normal and Hedgehog mutant larvae.

In the 1970s, a fundamental problem in developmental biology was to understand how a relatively simple egg can give rise to a complex segmented body plan. In the late 1970s Christiane Nüsslein-Volhard and Eric Wieschaus isolated mutations in genes that control development of the segmented anterior-posterior body axis of the fly; their "saturation mutagenesis" technique resulted in the discovery of a group of genes involved in the development of body segmentation, helping to found the field of evolutionary developmental biology. In 1995, they shared the Nobel Prize with Edward B. Lewis for their work studying genetic mutations in Drosophila embryogenesis.

The Drosophila hedgehog (hh) gene was identified as one of several genes important for creating the differences between the anterior and posterior parts of individual body segments. The fly hh gene was independently cloned in 1992 by the labs of Jym Mohler, Philip Beachy, Thomas B. Kornberg and Saigo Kaoru. Some hedgehog mutants result in abnormally-shaped embryos that are unusually short and stubby compared to wild type embryos. The function of the hedgehog segment polarity gene has been studied for influence on the normally polarized distribution of larval cuticular denticles as well as features on adult appendages such as legs and antennae. Rather than the normal pattern of denticles, hedgehog mutant larvae tend to have "solid lawns" of denticles (Figure 1). The appearance of the stubby and "hairy" larvae inspired the name 'hedgehog'.

== Fruit fly ==
Figure 2. Production of the CiR transcriptional repressor when Hh is not bound to Patched. In the diagram, "P" represents phosphate.

Figure 3. When Hh is bound to Patched (PTCH), Ci protein is able to act as a transcription factor in the nucleus.

=== Mechanism ===
Insect cells express a full size zinc-finger transcription factor Cubitus interruptus (Ci), which forms a complex with the kinesin-like protein Costal-2 (Cos2) and is localized in the cytoplasm bound to cellular microtubules (Figure 2). The SCF complex targets the 155 kDa full length Ci protein for proteosome-dependent cleavage, which generates a 75 kDa fragment (CiR). CiR builds up in the cell and diffuses into the nucleus, where it acts as a co-repressor for Hedgehog (Hh) target genes. The steps leading to Ci protein proteolysis include phosphorylation of Ci protein by several protein kinases; PKA, GSK3β and CK1 (Figure 2). The Drosophila protein Slimb is part of an SCF complex that targets proteins for ubiquitylation. Slimb binds to phosphorylated Ci protein.

In the absence of Hh (Figure 3), a cell-surface transmembrane protein called Patched (PTCH) acts to prevent high expression and activity of a 7 membrane spanning receptor called Smoothened (SMO). Patched has sequence similarity to known membrane transport proteins. When extracellular Hh is present (Figure 3), it binds to and inhibits Patched, allowing Smoothened to accumulate and inhibit the proteolytic cleavage of the Ci protein. This process most likely involves the direct interaction of Smoothened and Costal-2 and may involve sequestration of the Ci protein-containing complex to a microdomain where the steps leading to Ci protein proteolysis are disrupted. The mechanism by which Hh binding to Patched leads to increased levels of Smoothened is not clear (Step 1 in Figure 3). Following binding of Hh to Patched, Smoothened levels increase greatly over the level maintained in cells when Patched is not bound to Hh. It has been suggested that phosphorylation of Smoothened plays a role in Hh-dependent regulation of Smoothened levels.

In cells with Hh-activated Patched (Figure 3), the intact Ci protein accumulates in the cell cytoplasm and levels of CiR decrease, allowing transcription of some genes such as decapentaplegic (dpp, a member of the BMP growth factor family). For other Hh-regulated genes, expression requires not only the loss of CiR but also the positive action of uncleaved Ci to act as a transcriptional activator. Costal-2 is normally important for holding Ci protein in the cytoplasm, but interaction of Smoothened with Costal-2 allows some intact Ci protein to go to the nucleus. The Drosophila protein Fused (Fu in Figure 3) is a protein kinase that binds to Costal-2. Fused can inhibit Suppressor of Fused (SUFU), which in turn interacts with Ci to regulate gene transcription in some cell types.

=== Role ===
Figure 4. Interactions between Wingless and Hedgehog

Hedgehog has roles in larval body segment development and in formation of adult appendages. During the formation of body segments in the developing Drosophila embryo, stripes of cells that synthesize the transcription factor engrailed can also express the cell-to-cell signaling protein Hedgehog (green in Figure 4). Hedgehog is not free to move very far from the cells that make it and so it only activates a thin stripe of cells adjacent to the engrailed-expressing cells. When acting in this local fashion, hedgehog works as a paracrine factor. Only cells to one side of the engrailed-expressing cells are competent to respond to Hedgehog following interaction of Hh with the receptor protein Patched (blue in Figure 4).

Cells with Hh-activated Patched receptor synthesize the Wingless protein (red in Figure 4). If a Drosophila embryo is altered so as to produce Hh in all cells, all of the competent cells respond and form a broader band of Wingless-expressing cells in each segment. The wingless gene has an upstream transcription regulatory region that binds the Ci transcription factor in a Hh-dependent fashion resulting in an increase in wingless transcription (interaction 2 in Figure 3) in a stripe of cells adjacent to the stripe of Hh-producing cells.

Wingless protein acts as an extracellular signal and patterns the adjacent rows of cells by activating its cell surface receptor Frizzled. Wingless acts on engrailed-expressing cells to stabilize the stripes of engrailed expression. Wingless is a member of the Wnt family of cell-to-cell signaling proteins. The reciprocal signaling by Hedgehog and Wingless stabilizes the boundary between parasegments (Figure 4, top). The effects of Wingless and Hedgehog on other stripes of cells in each segment establishes a positional code that accounts for the distinct anatomical features along the anterior-posterior axis of the segments.

The Wingless protein is called "wingless" because of the phenotype of some wingless fly mutants. Wingless and Hedgehog function together during metamorphosis to coordinate wing formation. Hedgehog is expressed in the posterior part of developing Drosophila limbs. Hedgehog also participates in the coordination of eye, brain, gonad, gut and tracheal development. Downregulation of hedgehog has been implicated in reduced eye development in the amphipod Gammarus minus.

== Annelids ==
Hedgehog is also involved in segmentation in the annelid worms; because parallel evolution seems unlikely, this suggests a common origin of segmentation between the two phyla. Whilst Hh does not induce the formation of segments, it seems to act to stabilize the segmented fields once they have appeared.

== Vertebrates ==
=== Mechanism ===
Figure 5. Overview of Sonic hedgehog signaling.

Sonic hedgehog (SHH) is the best studied ligand of the vertebrate pathway. Most of what is known about hedgehog signaling has been established by studying SHH. It is translated as a ~45kDa precursor and undergoes autocatalytic processing (Process "1" on Figure 5) to produce an ~20kDa N-terminal signaling domain (referred to as SHH-N) and a ~25kDa C-terminal domain with no known signaling role. During the cleavage, a cholesterol molecule is added to the carboxyl end of the N-terminal domain, which is involved in trafficking, secretion and receptor interaction of the ligand. SHH can signal in an autocrine fashion, affecting the cells in which it is produced. Secretion and consequent paracrine hedgehog signaling require the participation of Dispatched (DISP) protein (Process "2" on Figure 5).

When SHH reaches its target cell, it binds to the Patched-1 (PTCH1) receptor (Process "3" on Figure 5, the blue molecule). In the absence of ligand, PTCH1 inhibits Smoothened (SMO), a downstream protein in the pathway (Process "4"). It has been suggested that SMO is regulated by a small molecule, the cellular localization of which is controlled by PTCH. PTCH1 has homology to Niemann-Pick disease, type C1 (NPC1) that is known to transport lipophilic molecules across a membrane. PTCH1 has a sterol sensing domain (SSD), which has been shown to be essential for suppression of SMO activity. A current theory suggests that PTCH regulates SMO by removing oxysterols from SMO. PTCH acts like a sterol pump and removes oxysterols that have been created by 7-dehydrocholesterol reductase. Upon binding of a Hh protein or a mutation in the SSD of PTCH, the pump is turned off allowing oxysterols to accumulate around SMO.

Suggested regulation pathway for Smo via Hedgehog and Ptch1

This accumulation of sterols allows SMO to become active or stay on the membrane for a longer period of time. This hypothesis is supported by the existence of a number of small molecule agonists and antagonists of the pathway that act on SMO. The binding of SHH relieves SMO inhibition, leading to activation of the GLI transcription factors (Process "5"): the activators Gli1 and Gli2 and the repressor Gli3. The sequence of molecular events that connect SMO to GLIs is poorly understood. Activated GLI accumulates in the nucleus (Process "6") and controls the transcription of hedgehog target genes (Process "7"). PTCH1 has recently been reported to repress transcription of hedgehog target genes through a mechanism independent of Smoothened.

In addition to PTCH1, mammals have another hedgehog receptor, PTCH2, whose sequence identity with PTCH1 is 54%. All three mammalian hedgehogs bind both receptors with similar affinity, so PTCH1 and PTCH2 cannot discriminate between the ligands. They do, however, differ in their expression patterns. PTCH2 is expressed at much higher levels in the testis and mediates desert hedgehog signaling there. It appears to have a distinct downstream signaling role from PTCH1. In the absence of ligand binding PTCH2 has a decreased ability to inhibit the activity of SMO. Furthermore, overexpression of PTCH2 does not replace mutated PTCH1 in basal cell carcinoma.

In invertebrates, just as in Drosophila, the binding of Hedgehog to PTCH leads to internalisation and sequestration of the ligand. Consequently, in vivo the passage of hedgehog over a receptive field that expresses the receptor leads to attenuation of the signal, an effect called ligand-dependent antagonism (LDA). In contrast to Drosophila, vertebrates possess another level of hedgehog regulation through LDA mediated by Hh-interacting protein 1 (HHIP1). HHIP1 also sequesters hedgehog ligands, but unlike PTCH, it has no effect on the activity of SMO.

=== Role ===
Figure 6. Sonic hedgehog specifies digit identity in mammalian development.

Members of the hedgehog family play key roles in a wide variety of developmental processes. One of the best studied examples is the action of Sonic hedgehog during development of the vertebrate limb. The classic experiments of Saunders and Gasseling in 1968 on the development of the chick limb bud formed the basis of the morphogen concept. They showed that identity of the digits in the chick limb was determined by a diffusible factor produced by the zone of polarizing activity (ZPA), a small region of tissue at the posterior margin of the limb. Mammalian development appeared to follow the same pattern. This diffusible factor was later shown to be Sonic hedgehog. However, precisely how SHH determines digit identity remained elusive until recently. The current model, proposed by Harfe et al., states that both the concentration and the time of exposure to SHH determines which digit the tissue will develop into in the mouse embryo (figure 6).

Digits V, IV and part of III arise directly from cells that express SHH during embryogenesis. In these cells SHH signals in an autocrine fashion and these digits develop correctly in the absence of DISP, which is required for extracellular diffusion of the ligand. These digits differ in the length of time that SHH continues to be expressed. The most posterior digit V develops from cells that express the ligand for the longest period of time. Digit IV cells express SHH for a shorter time, and digit III cells shorter still. Digit II develops from cells that are exposed to moderate concentrations of extracellular SHH. Finally, Digit I development does not require SHH. It is, in a sense, the default program of limb bud cells.

Hedgehog signaling remains important in the adult. Sonic hedgehog has been shown to promote the proliferation of adult stem cells from various tissues, including primitive hematopoietic cells, mammary and neural stem cells. Activation of the hedgehog pathway is required for transition of the hair follicle from the resting to the growth phase. This failed due to toxicities found in animal models.

=== Human disease ===
Disruption of hedgehog signaling during embryonic development, through either deleterious mutation or consumption of teratogens by the gestating mother, can lead to severe developmental abnormalities. Holoprosencephaly, the failure of the embryonic prosencephalon to divide to form cerebral hemispheres, occurs with a frequency of about 1 in 8,000 live births and about 1 in 200 spontaneous abortions in humans and is commonly linked to mutations in genes involved in the hedgehog pathway, including SHH and PTCH. Cyclopia, one of the most severe defects of holoprosencephaly, results if the pathway inhibitor cyclopamine is consumed by gestating mammals.

Activation of the hedgehog pathway has been implicated in the development of cancers in various organs, including brain, lung, mammary gland, prostate and skin. Basal cell carcinoma, the most common form of cancerous malignancy, has the closest association with hedgehog signaling. Loss-of-function mutations in Patched and activating mutations in Smoothened have been identified in patients with this disease. Abnormal activation of the pathway probably leads to development of disease through transformation of adult stem cells into cancer stem cells that give rise to the tumor. Cancer researchers hope that specific inhibitors of hedgehog signaling will provide an efficient therapy for a wide range of malignancies. The connection between the hedgehog signaling pathway and cancer development is very complex. Nevertheless, it is clear that the aberrant activation of hedgehog signaling leads to the growth, proliferation, and invasion of tumor cells. Besides its involvement in the development of cancers, hedgehog pathway may also contribute to major respiratory diseases such as pulmonary fibrosis. and chronic obstructive pulmonary disease.

==== Targeting the hedgehog pathway ====
The most common way to target this pathway is modulate SMO. Antagonist and agonist of SMO have already shown to affect the pathway regulation downstream. Several hedgehog signaling pathway inhibitors are available for cancer treatment, such as vismodegib and sonidegib. These drugs are regarded as promising cancer therapies, especially for patients with refractory/advanced cancers. SMO inhibitors represent a potential treatment for some types of cancers. However, because of harmful and potentially toxic side-effects of SMO inhibitors, undetermined safety in children, and the evidence that some patients develop resistance to SMO inhibitors, new classes of drugs are needed. The most clinically advanced SMO targeting agents are cyclopamine-competitive. Itraconazole (Sporanox) has also been shown to target SMO through a mechanism distinct from cyclopamine and vismodegib. Itraconazole (ITZ) inhibits SMO in the presence of mutations conferring resistance to vismodegib and other cyclopamine-competitive antagonists, like IPI-926 and Novartis' LDE-225. PTCH and Gli3 (5E1) antibodies are also a way to regulate the pathway. A downstream effector and strong transcriptional activator siRNA Gli1 has been used to inhibit cell growth and promote apoptosis. Arsenic trioxide (Trisenox) has also been shown to inhibit hedgehog signaling by interfering with Gli function and transcription.

Several environmental modifiers of Hedgehog signaling have been identified, which are potential health or developmental hazards. Dietary alkaloids found in tomatoes (tomatodine), potatoes (solanidine), nightshades like peppers and eggplant (solasodine). and turmeric (curcumin) have been shown to antagonize SMO and perturb Hedgehog signaling. In addition, certain environmental toxicants can block Hedgehog signaling. Piperonyl butoxide (PBO) is a semisynthetic pesticide additive developed in the 1940s, which can be found in thousands of household and agricultural products. Despite its widespread use, the ability of PBO to inhibit hedgehog signaling and act as a potent developmental teratogen was not recognized until recently.

==== Metastasis ====
Activation of the Hedgehog pathway leads to an increase in Snail protein expression and a decrease in E-cadherin and tight junctions.

==== Tumor regulation ====
Activation of the Hedgehog pathway leads to an increase in Angiogenic Factors (angiopoietin-1 and angiopoietin-2), Cyclins (cyclin D1 and B1), anti-apoptotic genes and a decrease in apoptotic genes (Fas). Dysfunction or aberrant activation of the Hh signaling pathway is associated with developmental deformities and cancers, including basal cell nevus syndrome (BCNS), basal cell carcinoma (BCC), medulloblastomas (MBs), rhabdomyosarcomas, and meningiomas. Approximately one-third of malignant tumors are linked to the aberrant activation of the Hh pathway. There are three proposed mechanisms of aberrant Hh signaling activation in different cancer types: Type I involves ligand-independent signaling due to mutations in Smo or negative regulators, Type II involves ligand-dependent autocrine/juxtacrine signaling with overexpression of Hh ligand, and Type III involves ligand-dependent paracrine signaling between tumor cells and stromal cells. These dysregulations in the Hh pathway can lead to tumor cell proliferation, survival, and the presence of cancer stem cells, which contribute to tumor initiation and progression.

==== Clinical trials ====
- Vismodegib FDA approved (Jan 2012) for basal cell carcinoma.
- Sonidegib FDA approved (July 2015) for basal cell carcinoma.
- Itraconazole

== Evolution ==
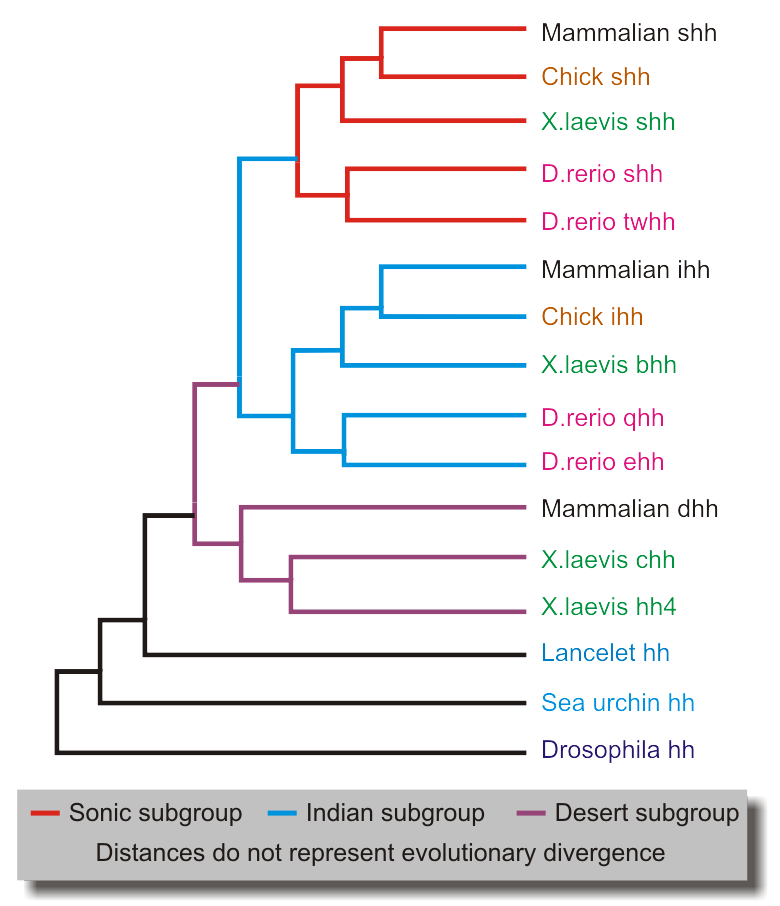
Figure 7. Phylogenetic relationship of hedgehog ligands (based on Ingham and McMahon, 2001).

Lancelets, which are primitive chordates, possess only one homologue of Drosophila Hh (figure 7). Vertebrates, on the other hand, have several Hedgehog ligands that fall within three subgroups – Desert, Indian and Sonic, each represented by a single mammalian gene. This is a consequence of the two rounds of whole genome duplication that occurred early in the vertebrate evolutionary history. Two such events would have produced four homologous genes, one of which must have been lost. Desert Hedgehogs are the most closely related to Drosophila Hh. Additional gene duplications occurred within some species such as the zebrafish Danio rerio, which has an additional tiggywinkle hedgehog gene in the sonic group. Various vertebrate lineages have adapted hedgehogs to unique developmental processes. For example, a homologue of the X.laevis banded hedgehog is involved in regeneration of the salamander limb.

shh has undergone accelerated evolution in the primate lineage leading to humans. Dorus et al. hypothesise that this allowed for more complex regulation of the protein and may have played a role in the increase in volume and complexity of the human brain.

The frizzled family of WNT receptors have some sequence similarity to Smoothened. Smoothened seems to be a functionally divergent member of the G protein-coupled receptor (GPCR) superfamily. Other similarities between the WNT and Hh signaling pathways have been reviewed. Nusse observed that, "a signalling system based on lipid-modified proteins and specific membrane translocators is ancient, and may have been the founder of the Wnt and Hh signaling systems".

It has been suggested that invertebrate and vertebrate signalling downstream from Smoothened has diverged significantly. The role of Suppressor of Fused (SUFU) has been enhanced in vertebrates compared to Drosophila where its role is relatively minor. Costal-2 is particularly important in Drosophila. The protein kinase Fused is a regulator of SUFU in Drosophila, but may not play a role in the Hh pathway of vertebrates. In vertebrates, Hh signalling has been heavily implicated in the development of cilia.

There is striking domain level evolution present in the Hedgehog family of proteins, the N-terminal domain (Hedge) and the C-terminal domain (Hog), that were later spliced together into a single transcriptional unit. The Hog domain contains a sequence called Hint (Hedgehog INTein), which is similar in sequence and function to bacterial and fungal inteins. The Hog domain is present in many eukaryotic branches, i.e. red algae, mosses, dinoflagellates, jakobids, and other single cell eurkaryotes. Choanoflagellates contain a gene named hoglet that also encodes the hedgehog C-terminal domain Hog domain. However, Choanoflagellates and lower eukaryotes do not contain any regions similar to the hedge domain, suggesting that hog evolved first. Poriferans have both hedge-like proteins (termed hedgling) and hog-like proteins, but they exist as two completely separate transcriptional units. Cnidarians contain the hedgling and hog genes, but also have a complete hedgehog gene, indicating that hedge and hog were spliced into hedgehog after the last common ancestor of poriferans and cnidarians.

Bilaterians do not contain hedgling genes, suggesting that these were lost by deletion before this branch split from the other metazoans. However, Hog domain-containing genes without a Hedge domain are present in several bilaterian lineages. They are found in Lophotrochozoa and Nematoda. Hedgehog-like genes, 2 Patched homologs and Patched-related genes exist in the worm C. elegans. These genes have been shown to code for proteins that have roles in C. elegans development. Whilst Enoplea nematodes have retained a bona-fide Hedgehog, Chromadoreans have lost the archetypal Hedgehog and have instead evolved an expanded repertoire of 61 divergent semi-orthologous genes with novel N-terminal domains associated with Hog. These N-terminal domains associated with Hog in C. elegans were subsequently classified, initially Warthog (WRT) and Groundhog (GRD), followed by Ground-like (GRL) and Quahog (QUA). C. elegans, along with other nematode species, have lost the GPCR Smoothened.

The ultimate origin of the Hedgehog signaling pathway is hypothesized to be a bacterial regulatory pathway of hopanoids that are common lipid components in bacteria and are structural analogs of steroids.

== See also ==
- Sonic hedgehog, best studied ligand of the vertebrate pathway
- Smoothened, the conserved GPCR component of the pathway
- Netpath – A curated resource of signal transduction pathways in humans
- Inhibitors of Hh signaling
  - Cyclopamine, a naturally occurring small molecule
  - Sonidegib
  - Vismodegib, approved for basal cell carcinoma.
