= Sonidegib =

Chemical compound

Clinical data
- Trade names: Odomzo
- Other names: LDE225, erismodegib
- AHFS/Drugs.com: Monograph
- MedlinePlus: a615034
- License data: EU EMA: by INN; US DailyMed: Sonidegib
- Pregnancy category: Contraindicated (X)
- Routes of administration: By mouth
- Drug class: Antineoplastic
- ATC code: L01XJ02 (WHO)

Legal status
- Legal status: AU: S4 (Prescription only); CA: ℞-only; US: ℞-only; EU: Rx-only; In general: ℞ (Prescription only)

Pharmacokinetic data
- Bioavailability: <10%
- Protein binding: >97%
- Metabolism: Liver (CYP3A)
- Elimination half-life: ~28 days
- Excretion: Feces (~70%), urine (30%)

Identifiers
- IUPAC name: N-[6-[(2S,6R)-2,6-Dimethylmorpholin-4-yl]pyridin-3-yl]-2-methyl-3-[4-(trifluoromethoxy)phenyl]benzamide
- CAS Number: 956697-53-3
- PubChem CID: 24775005
- DrugBank: DB09143
- ChemSpider: 25027390
- UNII: 0RLU3VTK5M
- KEGG: D10119; as salt: D10729
- ChEBI: CHEBI:90863
- ChEMBL: ChEMBL2105737
- CompTox Dashboard (EPA): DTXSID501009335

Chemical and physical data
- Formula: C_{26}H_{26}F_{3}N_{3}O_{3}
- Molar mass: 485.507 g·mol^{−1}
- 3D model (JSmol): Interactive image
- SMILES: C[C@@H]1CN(C[C@@H](O1)C)C2=NC=C(C=C2)NC(=O)C3=CC=CC(=C3C)C4=CC=C(C=C4)OC(F)(F)F
- InChI: InChI=1S/C26H26F3N3O3/c1-16-14-32(15-17(2)34-16)24-12-9-20(13-30-24)31-25(33)23-6-4-5-22(18(23)3)19-7-10-21(11-8-19)35-26(27,28)29/h4-13,16-17H,14-15H2,1-3H3,(H,31,33)/t16-,17+; Key:VZZJRYRQSPEMTK-CALCHBBNSA-N

Sonidegib (INN), sold under the brand name Odomzo, is a medication used to treat cancer.

Sonidegib is a Hedgehog signaling pathway inhibitor (via smoothened antagonism).

== Approvals and indications ==
It was approved for medical use in the United States and in the European Union in 2015

It is indicated for the treatment of adults with locally advanced basal-cell carcinoma that has recurred following surgery or radiation therapy, or those who are not candidates for surgery or radiation therapy.

== Pharmacology ==
Sonidegib is administered by mouth. Common side effects include muscle spasms, hair loss, fatigue, abdominal pain, nausea, headache, and weight loss.

Sonidegib binds to and inhibits smoothened to inhibit activation of the Hedgehog pathway. Sonidegib is primarily metabolized by CYP3A and is eliminated hepatically.

== Development ==
It has been investigated as a potential treatment for:

- Pancreatic cancer
- Breast cancer
- Basal cell carcinoma of the skin
- Small cell lung cancer
- Medulloblastoma
- Advanced solid tumors (including ovarian, breast, pancreatic, stomach, oesophageal cancers and glioblastoma multiforme)
- Acute leukemia and chronic myeloid leukemia
- Myelofibrosis and essential thrombocythaemia

It has demonstrated significant efficacy against melanoma in vitro and in vivo. It also demonstrated efficacy in a mouse model of pancreatic cancer.
