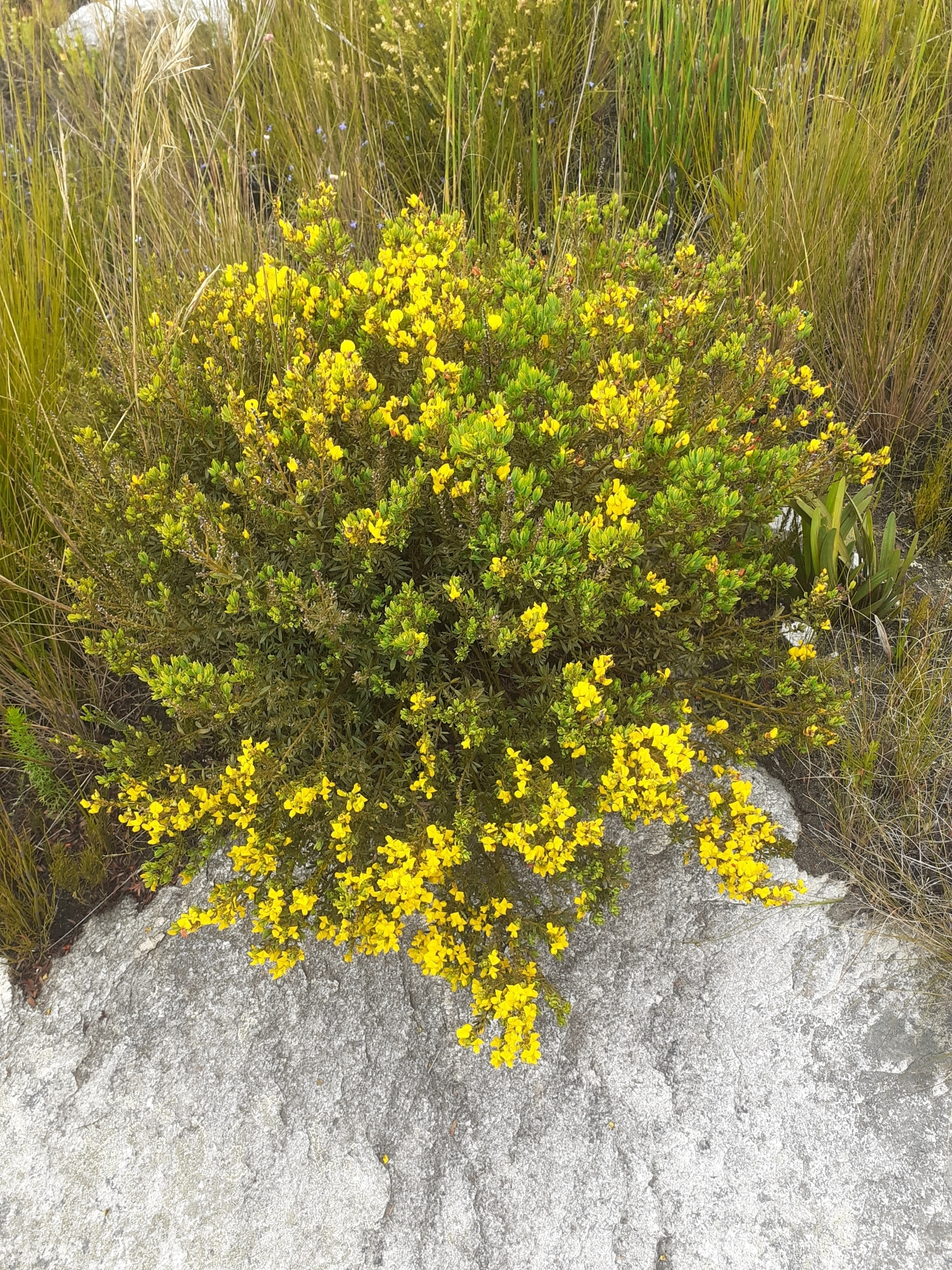

Scientific classification
- Kingdom: Plantae
- Clade: Tracheophytes
- Clade: Angiosperms
- Clade: Eudicots
- Clade: Rosids
- Order: Fabales
- Family: Fabaceae
- Subfamily: Faboideae
- Genus: Cyclopia
- Species: C. buxifolia

Binomial name
- Cyclopia buxifolia (Burm.f.) Kies
- Distribution map

Synonyms
- Cyclopia dregeana Kies; Cyclopia falcata var. ovata Kies; Cyclopia latifolia E.Mey.; Genista buxifolia Burm.f.

= Cyclopia buxifolia =

Species of plant

Cyclopia buxifolia is a shrub belonging to the genus Cyclopia. The species is endemic to the Western Cape and occurs from the Skurweberge to the Outeniqua Mountains at altitudes of 830 - 1 670 m. The plant is part of the fynbos.
