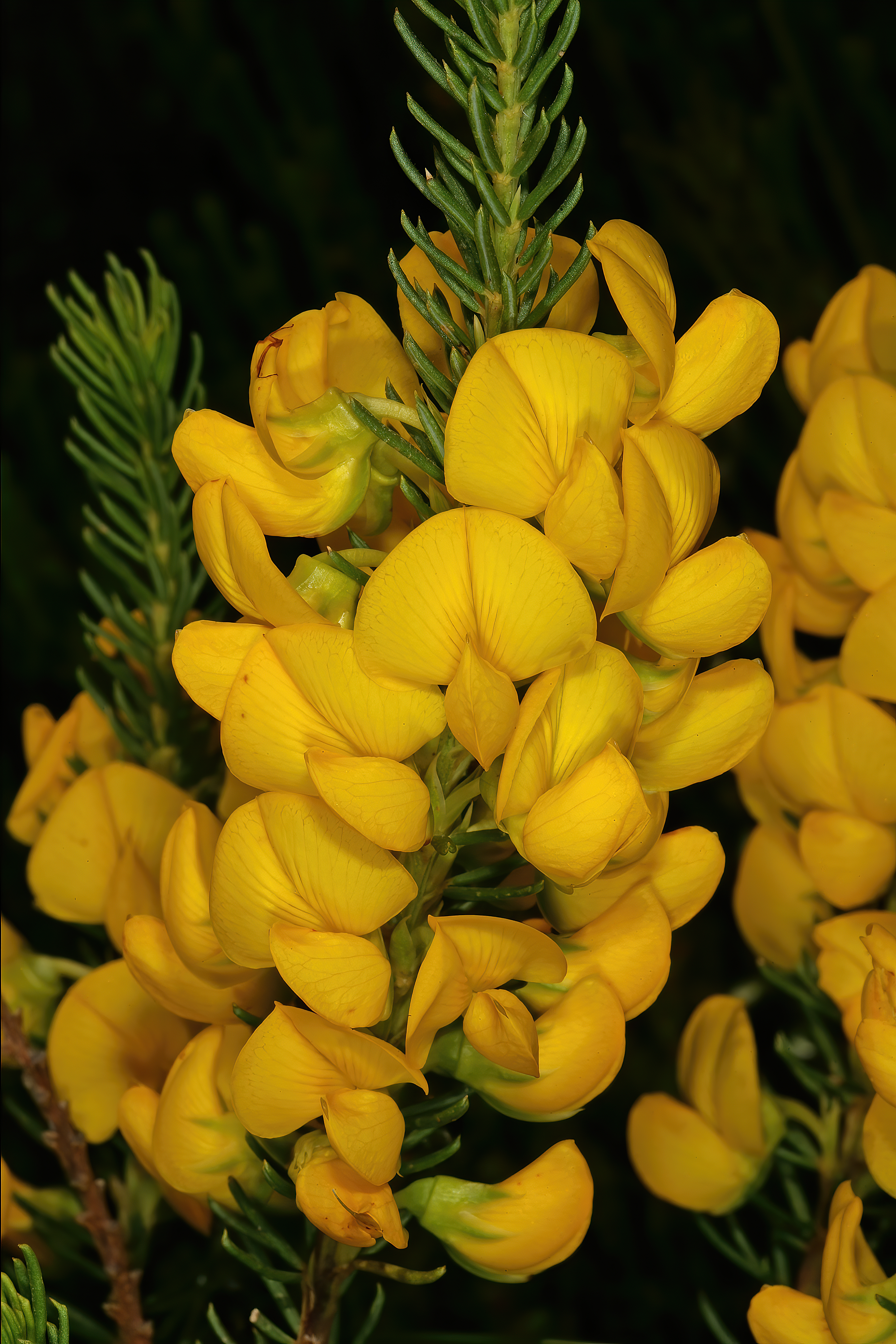

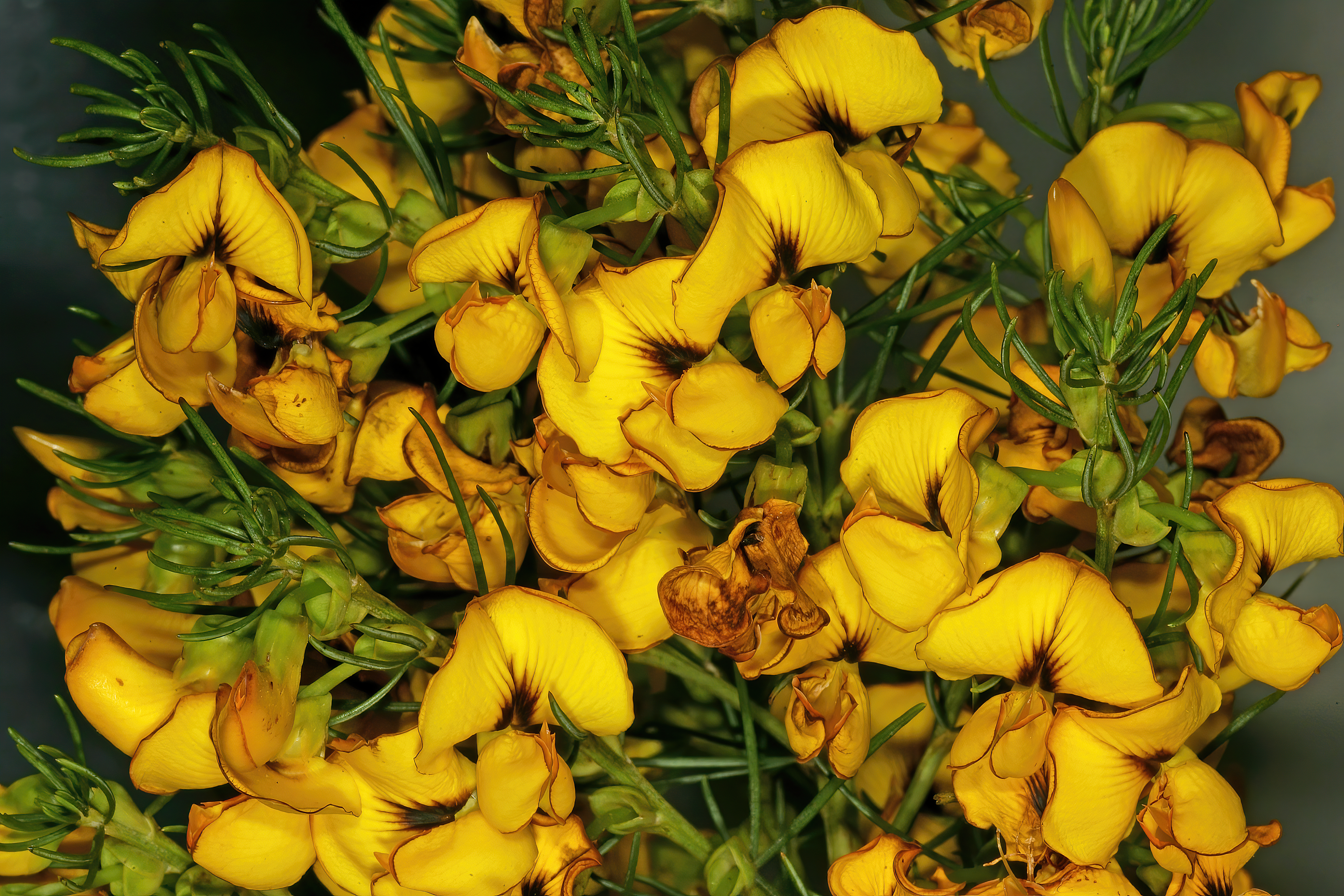

Conservation status
- Near Threatened (IUCN 3.1)

Scientific classification
- Kingdom: Plantae
- Clade: Tracheophytes
- Clade: Angiosperms
- Clade: Eudicots
- Clade: Rosids
- Order: Fabales
- Family: Fabaceae
- Subfamily: Faboideae
- Genus: Cyclopia
- Species: C. genistoides

Binomial name
- Cyclopia genistoides (L.) R.Br.

Synonyms
- Cyclopia galioides E.Mey. ex Benth.; Cyclopia genistoides var. heterophylla (Eckl. & Zeyh.) Harv.; Cyclopia genistoides var. teretifolia (Eckl. & Zeyh.) Kies; Cyclopia heterophylla Eckl. & Zeyh.; Cyclopia teretifolia Eckl. & Zeyh.; Galega genistoides (L.) Thunb.; Ibbetsonia genistoides (L.) Sims; Sophora genistifolia Salisb.; Sophora genistoides L.; Virgilia genistoides (L.) Poir.

= Cyclopia genistoides =

Species of plant

Cyclopia genistoides, the common honeybush tea, is a shrub belonging to the genus Cyclopia. The species is endemic to the Western Cape. It occurs from Malmesbury to the Cape Peninsula and eastwards to Albertinia. This is the original species from which honeybush tea was made, currently the tea is grown from five Cyclopia species. The plant has lost 25% of its habitat to crop cultivation and suburban development, especially in the lower parts of Malmesbury, Cape Peninsula, Kleinmond, Hermanus and Albertinia. Overexploitation of the species by both legal and illegal tea manufacturers is also a threat.
