= Cyclopia maculata =

Scientific classification
- Kingdom: Plantae
- Clade: Tracheophytes
- Clade: Angiosperms
- Clade: Eudicots
- Clade: Rosids
- Order: Fabales
- Family: Fabaceae
- Subfamily: Faboideae
- Genus: Cyclopia
- Species: C. maculata

Binomial name
- Cyclopia maculata (Andrews) Kies
- Distribution map

Synonyms
- Cyclopia laricina E.Mey.; Cyclopia tenuifolia Lehm.; Gompholobium maculatum Andrews

Species of plant

Cyclopia maculata, the needle-leaved honeybush tea, is a shrub belonging to the genus Cyclopia. The species is endemic to the Western Cape and occurs from Bainskloof to Riversdale. It has a range of 11 226 km^{2} and there are currently fifteen known subpopulations; there may be more. The plant is part of the fynbos. It grows along river banks and is threatened by invasive plants, especially Acacia species. The species' numbers are also declining due to over-cultivation by honeybush tea producers.

The tree's FSA number is 224.3.
