= Cyclopia (disambiguation) =

Cyclopia can refer to:

- Cyclopia, a congenital disorder
- Cyclopia (plant), a genus of leguminous plants in the subfamily Faboideae
