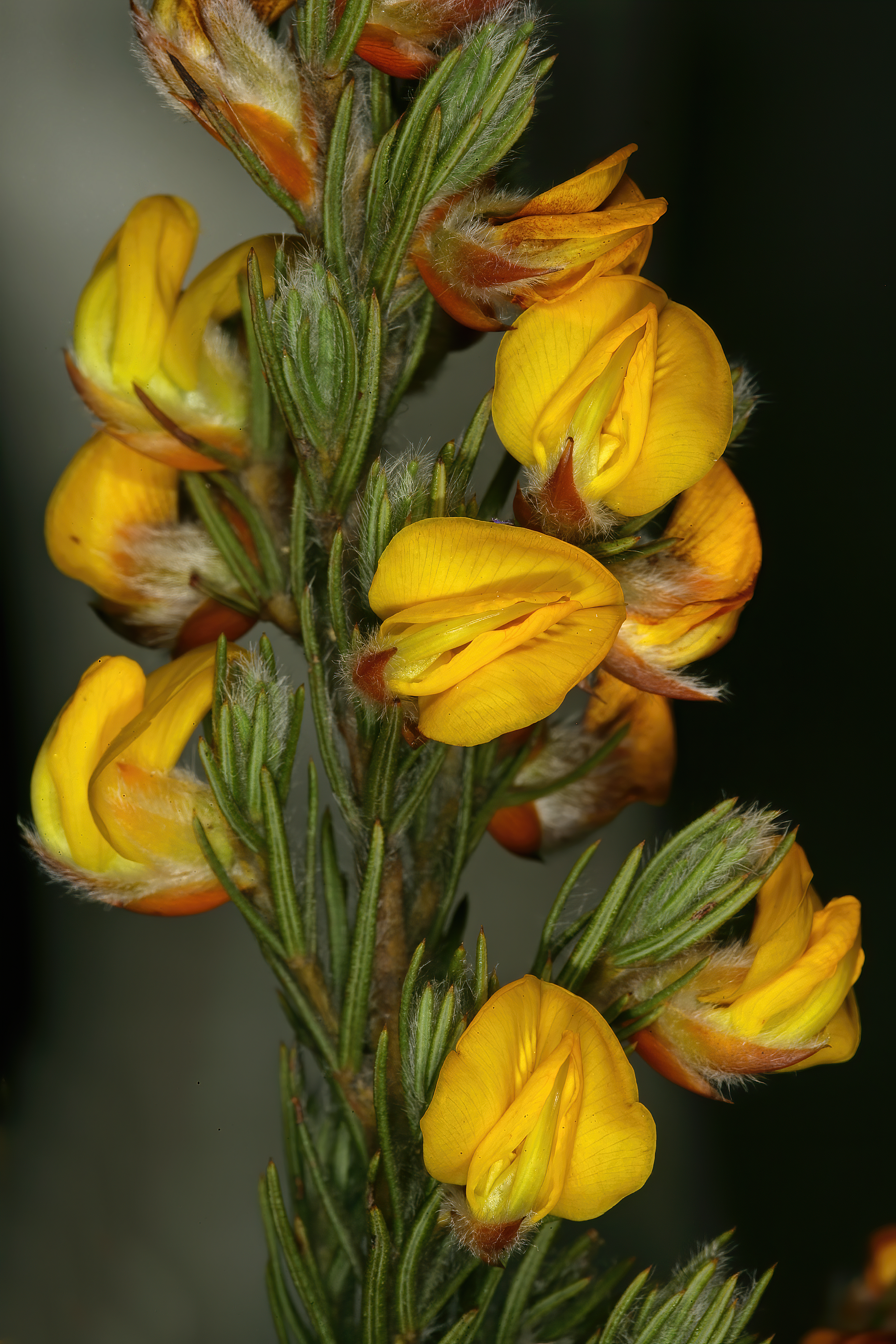

Scientific classification
- Kingdom: Plantae
- Clade: Tracheophytes
- Clade: Angiosperms
- Clade: Eudicots
- Clade: Rosids
- Order: Fabales
- Family: Fabaceae
- Subfamily: Faboideae
- Genus: Cyclopia
- Species: C. meyeriana

Binomial name
- Cyclopia meyeriana Walp, (1840)
- Distribution map

Synonyms
- Cyclopia montana Hofmeyr & E.Phillips; Cyclopia sessiliflora E.Mey.

= Cyclopia meyeriana =

Species of plant

Cyclopia meyeriana the Meyer honeybush tea, is a shrub belonging to the genus Cyclopia. The species is endemic to the Western Cape and occurs from the Cederberg to the Riviersonderend Mountains. It has a range of 8 500 km^{2} and is found at altitudes of 1 000-1 800 m. The plant is part of the fynbos.
