= Cyclopia aurescens =

Scientific classification
- Kingdom: Plantae
- Clade: Tracheophytes
- Clade: Angiosperms
- Clade: Eudicots
- Clade: Rosids
- Order: Fabales
- Family: Fabaceae
- Subfamily: Faboideae
- Genus: Cyclopia
- Species: C. aurescens

Binomial name
- Cyclopia aurescens Kies
- Distribution map

Species of plant

Cyclopia aurescens is a shrub belonging to the genus Cyclopia. The species is endemic to the Western Cape and occurs in the Klein Swartberg Mountains. It has a range of 37 km^{2} and grows on slopes higher than 1 800 m. The plant is part of the fynbos and is considered rare.
