= Cyclopia latifolia =

Scientific classification
- Kingdom: Plantae
- Clade: Tracheophytes
- Clade: Angiosperms
- Clade: Eudicots
- Clade: Rosids
- Order: Fabales
- Family: Fabaceae
- Subfamily: Faboideae
- Genus: Cyclopia
- Species: C. latifolia

Binomial name
- Cyclopia latifolia DC.
- Distribution map

Synonyms
- Cyclopia cordifolia Benth.; Lebeckia subternata Link; Podalyria laevigata Willd. ex Walp.

Species of plant

Cyclopia latifolia, the Table Mountain honeybush tea, is a shrub belonging to the genus Cyclopia. The species is endemic to the Western Cape and occurs in the Cape Peninsula on Constantiaberg and Table Mountain at altitudes of 900-1000 m. The population consists of only 23 plants and is threatened by a lack of fire control. The plant is part of the fynbos and is considered rare.
