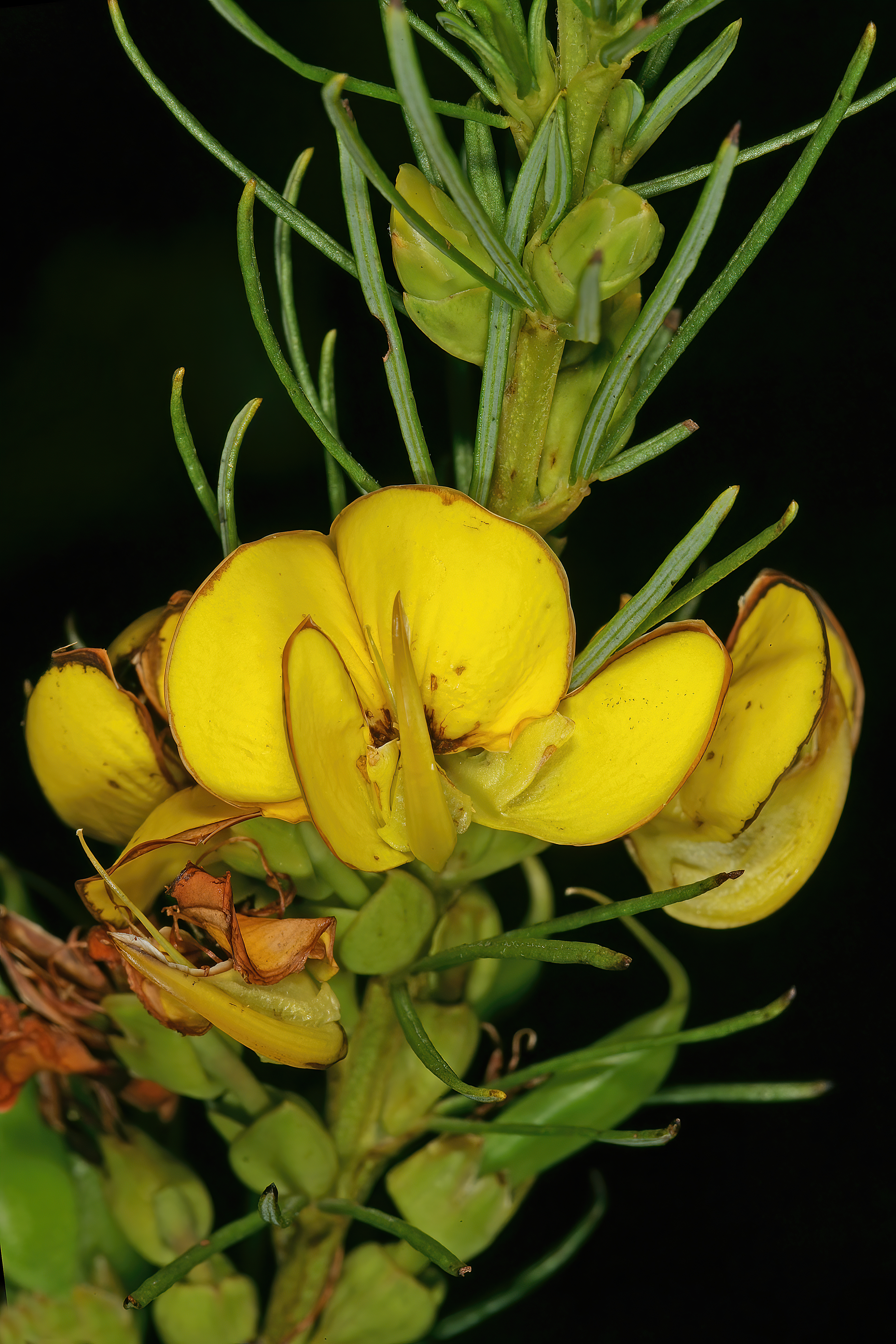

Conservation status
- Near Threatened (IUCN 3.1)

Scientific classification
- Kingdom: Plantae
- Clade: Tracheophytes
- Clade: Angiosperms
- Clade: Eudicots
- Clade: Rosids
- Order: Fabales
- Family: Fabaceae
- Subfamily: Faboideae
- Genus: Cyclopia
- Species: C. sessiliflora

Binomial name
- Cyclopia sessiliflora Eckl. & Zeyh.
- Distribution map

Synonyms
- Cyclopia brachypoda Benth.; Cyclopia vogelii var. brachypoda (Benth.) Harv.

= Cyclopia sessiliflora =

Species of plant

Cyclopia sessiliflora, the Heidelberg tea, is a shrub belonging to the genus Cyclopia. The species is endemic to the Western Cape and occurs in the Langeberg and Warmwatersberg. The species is one of the five used for making honeybush tea. The plant has a range of less than 1 336 km^{2} and there are between fifteen and twenty subpopulations. The plant is part of the fynbos and is further threatened by over-processing by tea producers, the population's numbers are declining as a result.
