= Cyclopia galioides =

Scientific classification
- Kingdom: Plantae
- Clade: Tracheophytes
- Clade: Angiosperms
- Clade: Eudicots
- Clade: Rosids
- Order: Fabales
- Family: Fabaceae
- Subfamily: Faboideae
- Genus: Cyclopia
- Species: C. galioides

Binomial name
- Cyclopia galioides (P.J.Bergius) DC.
- Distribution map

Synonyms
- Cyclopia capensis T.M.Salter; Podalyria genistoides Willd.; Sophora galioides P.J.Bergius

Species of plant

Cyclopia galioides, the peninsula honeybush, is a shrub belonging to the genus Cyclopia. The species is endemic to the Western Cape and occurs only on the Cape Peninsula where it enjoys the protection of the Table Mountain National Park. The plant is part of the fynbos and is considered rare.
