= Cyclopia plicata =

Scientific classification
- Kingdom: Plantae
- Clade: Tracheophytes
- Clade: Angiosperms
- Clade: Eudicots
- Clade: Rosids
- Order: Fabales
- Family: Fabaceae
- Subfamily: Faboideae
- Genus: Cyclopia
- Species: C. plicata

Binomial name
- Cyclopia plicata Kies
- Distribution map

Species of plant

Cyclopia plicata, the shaleband honeybush, is a shrub belonging to the genus Cyclopia. The species is endemic to the Eastern Cape and the Western Cape and occurs in the Kammanassie Mountains and Kouga Mountains where it has an area of occurrence of 219 km^{2}. There are four subpopulations and the plant's numbers are declining due to over-processing by honeybush tea producers. The plant is part of the fynbos. The plant is also threatened by a lack of fire control programs.
