= Cyclopia alopecuroides =

Scientific classification
- Kingdom: Plantae
- Clade: Tracheophytes
- Clade: Angiosperms
- Clade: Eudicots
- Clade: Rosids
- Order: Fabales
- Family: Fabaceae
- Subfamily: Faboideae
- Genus: Cyclopia
- Species: C. alopecuroides

Binomial name
- Cyclopia alopecuroides A.L.Schutte
- Distribution map

Species of plant

Cyclopia alopecuroides is a shrub belonging to the genus Cyclopia. The species is endemic to the Western Cape and occurs in the Great Swartberg and Kammanassie Mountains. The plant is part of the fynbos.
