= Cyclopia bolusii =

Conservation status
- Vulnerable (IUCN 3.1)

Scientific classification
- Kingdom: Plantae
- Clade: Tracheophytes
- Clade: Angiosperms
- Clade: Eudicots
- Clade: Rosids
- Order: Fabales
- Family: Fabaceae
- Subfamily: Faboideae
- Genus: Cyclopia
- Species: C. bolusii

Binomial name
- Cyclopia bolusii Hofmeyr & E.Phillips
- Distribution map

Species of plant

Cyclopia bolusii is a shrub belonging to the genus Cyclopia. The species is endemic to the Western Cape and occurs in the Great Swartberg Mountains. The total population is estimated to be less than 1,000 plants, subpopulations consist of less than 10 plants each. The plant is part of the fynbos; it is threatened by excessive picking by collectors and water abstraction.
