= Ernestia =

Ernestia may refer to:

- Ernestia, an alternative scientific name for Agdistis, genus of moths in the family Pterophoridae
- Ernestia, an alternative scientific name for Panzeria, a genus of flies in the family Tachinidae
- Ernestia (plant) DC., 1828, a genus of plant in the family Melastomataceae
