= Cyclopia filiformis =

Scientific classification
- Kingdom: Plantae
- Clade: Tracheophytes
- Clade: Angiosperms
- Clade: Eudicots
- Clade: Rosids
- Order: Fabales
- Family: Fabaceae
- Subfamily: Faboideae
- Genus: Cyclopia
- Species: C. filiformis

Binomial name
- Cyclopia filiformis Kies

Species of plant

Cyclopia filiformis, the Van Staden's honeybush, is a shrub belonging to the genus Cyclopia. The endemic is extinct and was native to the Western Cape and occurred in the Van Staden's Mountains. The plant was part of the fynbos. It was last seen in 1897.
