= Cyclopia squamosa =

Scientific classification
- Kingdom: Plantae
- Clade: Tracheophytes
- Clade: Angiosperms
- Clade: Eudicots
- Clade: Rosids
- Order: Fabales
- Family: Fabaceae
- Subfamily: Faboideae
- Genus: Cyclopia
- Species: C. squamosa

Binomial name
- Cyclopia squamosa A.L.Schutte
- Distribution map

Species of plant

Cyclopia squamosa, the Wemmershoek honeybush, is a shrub belonging to the genus Cyclopia. The species is endemic to the Western Cape and occurs in the Wemmershoek Mountains. The plant is rare, the population consists of only ten plants that occur singly. The plant is part of the fynbos and is further threatened by invasive plants and uncontrolled fires.
