= Cyclopia pubescens =

Scientific classification
- Kingdom: Plantae
- Clade: Tracheophytes
- Clade: Angiosperms
- Clade: Eudicots
- Clade: Rosids
- Order: Fabales
- Family: Fabaceae
- Subfamily: Faboideae
- Genus: Cyclopia
- Species: C. pubescens

Binomial name
- Cyclopia pubescens Eckl. & Zeyh.
- Distribution map

Species of plant

Cyclopia pubescens, commonly known as Algoa honeybush or fluffy honeybush, is a shrub belonging to the genus Cyclopia. The species is endemic to the Eastern Cape and occurs in Port Elizabeth. The plant has a range of less than 67 km^{2} and has already lost 80% of its habitat to development, crop cultivation and invasive plants. There are currently eleven fragmented subpopulations remaining that are monitored by the Custodians of Rare and Endangered Wildflowers, a volunteer group. Some of the subpopulations are threatened by swamp rats and even residents who cut grass. The plant is part of the fynbos.
