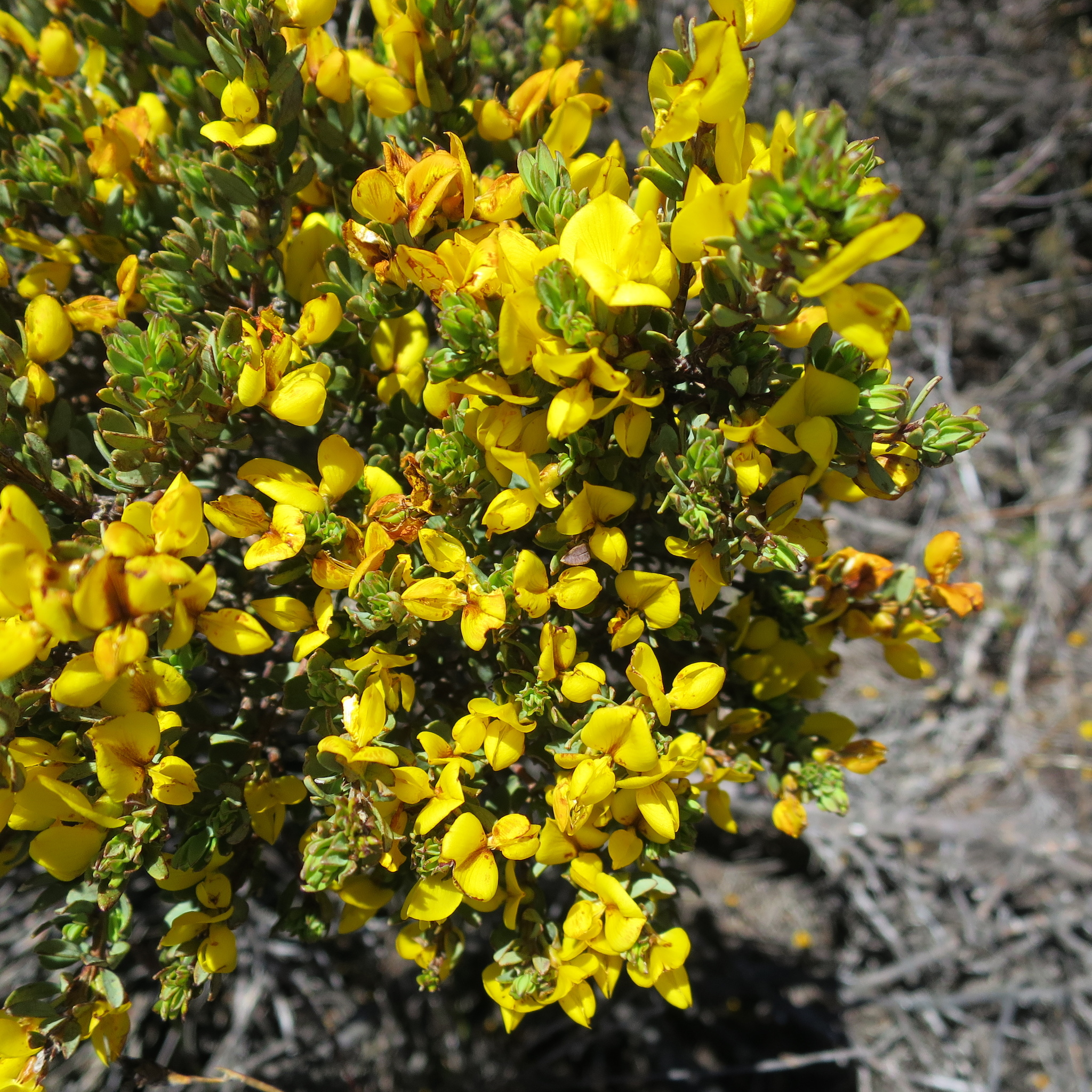

Scientific classification
- Kingdom: Plantae
- Clade: Tracheophytes
- Clade: Angiosperms
- Clade: Eudicots
- Clade: Rosids
- Order: Fabales
- Family: Fabaceae
- Subfamily: Faboideae
- Genus: Cyclopia
- Species: C. burtonii

Binomial name
- Cyclopia burtonii Hofmeyr & E.Phillips, (1922)
- Distribution map

= Cyclopia burtonii =

Species of plant

Cyclopia burtonii is a shrub belonging to the genus Cyclopia. The species is endemic to the Western Cape and occurs in the Swartberg Mountains at altitudes of 1600–2070 m. It has a range of 172 km^{2} and there are four subpopulations. The total population is estimated at less than 1000 plants. The plant is part of the fynbos. The plant is threatened by honeybush tea producers who pick too many plants.
