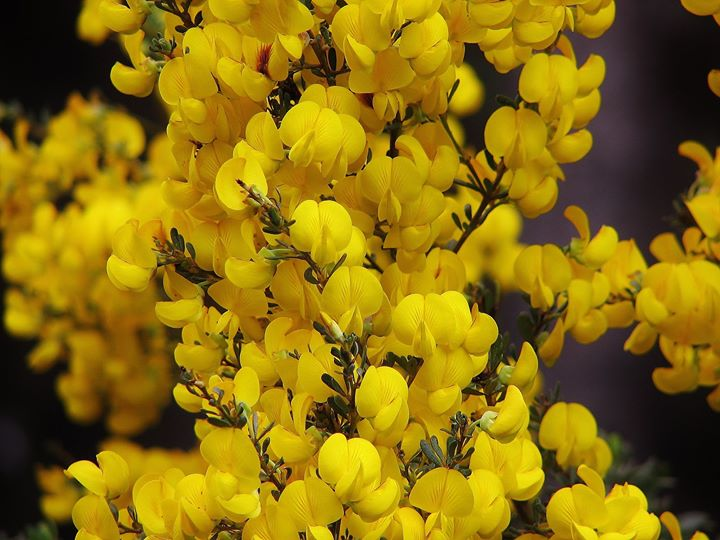

Scientific classification
- Kingdom: Plantae
- Clade: Tracheophytes
- Clade: Angiosperms
- Clade: Eudicots
- Clade: Rosids
- Order: Fabales
- Family: Fabaceae
- Subfamily: Faboideae
- Genus: Cyclopia
- Species: C. falcata

Binomial name
- Cyclopia falcata (Harv.) Kies
- Distribution map

Synonyms
- Cyclopia vogelii var. falcata Harv.; Cyclopia brachypoda Hofmeyr & E.Phillips

= Cyclopia falcata =

Species of plant

Cyclopia falcata is a shrub belonging to the genus Cyclopia. The species is endemic to the Western Cape and occurs in the Witzenberg, Groot Winterhoek, Franschhoek and Caledon Mountains at altitudes of 550 - 1 600 m. The plant is part of the fynbos.
