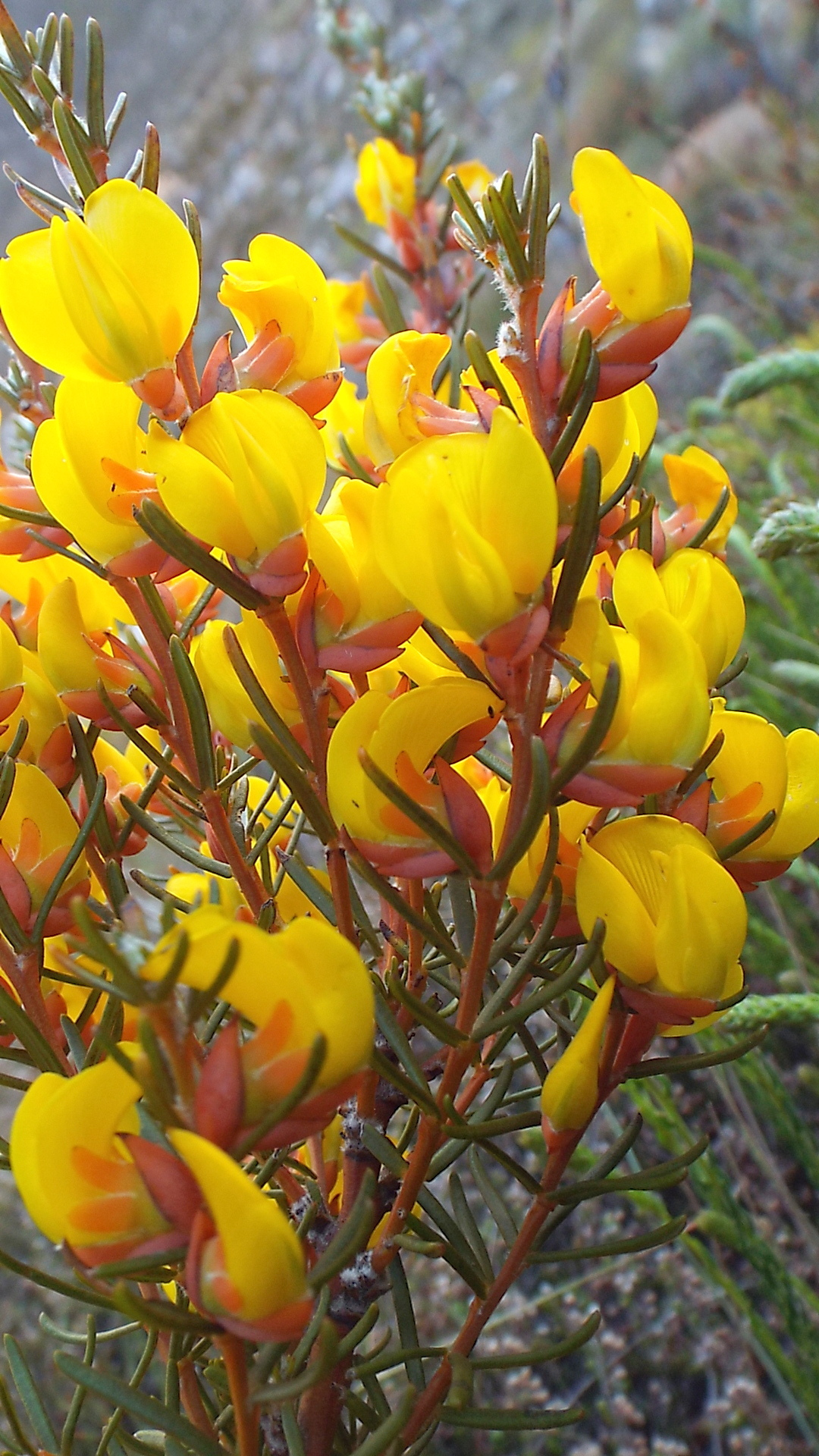

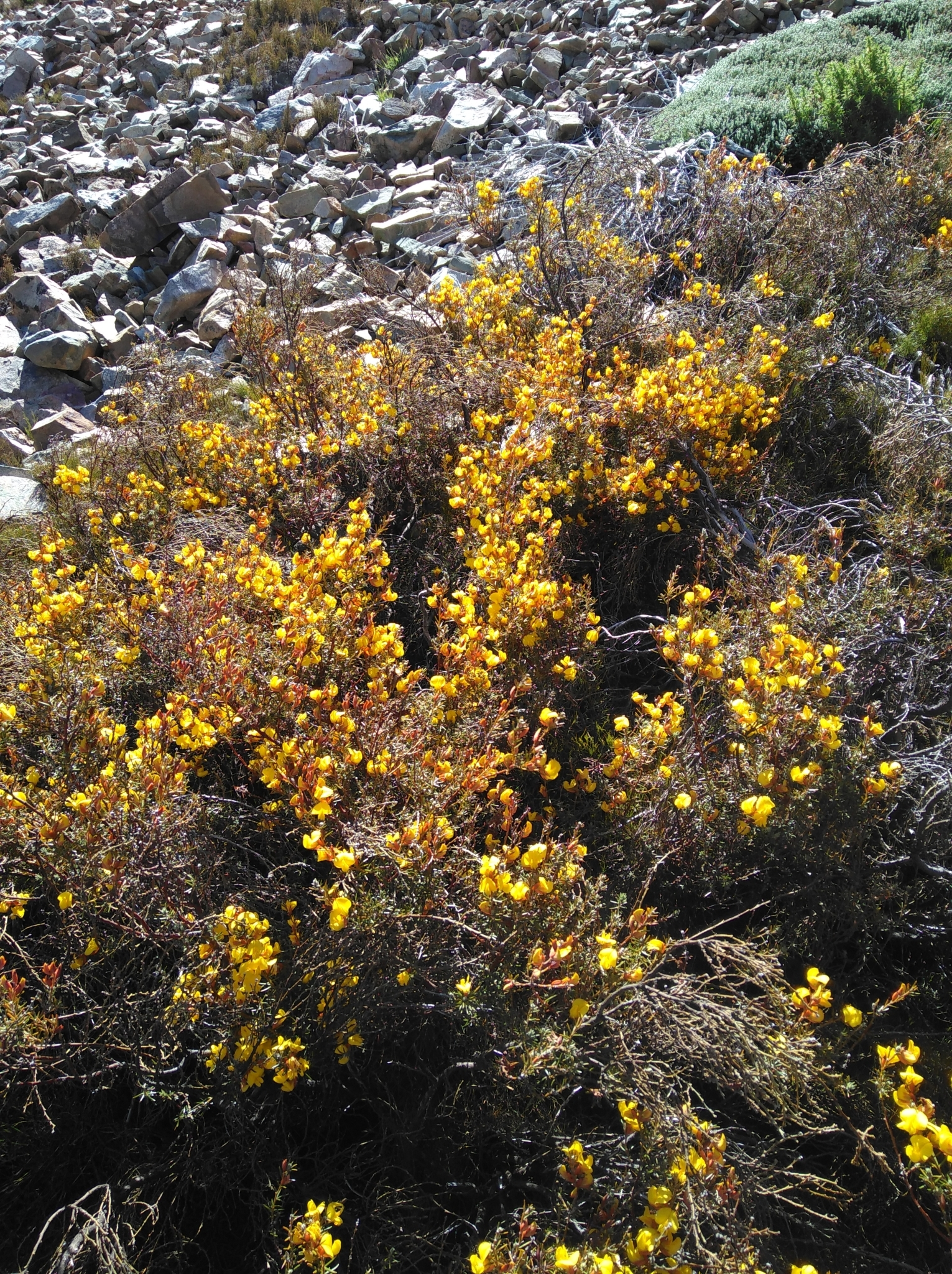

Scientific classification
- Kingdom: Plantae
- Clade: Tracheophytes
- Clade: Angiosperms
- Clade: Eudicots
- Clade: Rosids
- Order: Fabales
- Family: Fabaceae
- Subfamily: Faboideae
- Genus: Cyclopia
- Species: C. glabra

Binomial name
- Cyclopia glabra (Hofmeyr & E.Phillips) A.L.Schutte
- Distribution map

Synonyms
- Cyclopia montana var. glabra Hofmeyr & E.Phillips

= Cyclopia glabra =

Species of plant

Cyclopia glabra, the smooth honeybush, is a shrub belonging to the genus Cyclopia. The species is endemic to the Western Cape and occurs only in the Hex River Mountains where it has a range of 170 km^{2}. The plant is part of the fynbos and is considered rare.
