= Cyclopia intermedia =

Scientific classification
- Kingdom: Plantae
- Clade: Embryophytes
- Clade: Tracheophytes
- Clade: Spermatophytes
- Clade: Angiosperms
- Clade: Eudicots
- Clade: Rosids
- Order: Fabales
- Family: Fabaceae
- Subfamily: Faboideae
- Genus: Cyclopia
- Species: C. intermedia

Binomial name
- Cyclopia intermedia E.Mey.
- Cyclopia intermedia is endemic to South Africa.

Synonyms
- Cyclopia aurea Fourc; Cyclopia brachypoda var. intermedia (E. Mey.) Hofmeyr & E. Phillips; Cyclopia subternata sensu Hofmeyr & E. Phillips; Cyclopia vogelii var. intermedia (E. Mey.) Harv.

Species of legume

Cyclopia intermedia is a species of flowering plant in the legume family, Fabaceae. So called honeybush tea is made from fermented leaves and stems of this plant.
