= Cyclopia longifolia =

Scientific classification
- Kingdom: Plantae
- Clade: Tracheophytes
- Clade: Angiosperms
- Clade: Eudicots
- Clade: Rosids
- Order: Fabales
- Family: Fabaceae
- Subfamily: Faboideae
- Genus: Cyclopia
- Species: C. longifolia

Binomial name
- Cyclopia longifolia Vogel
- Distribution map

Species of plant

Cyclopia longifolia, the Van Stadensberg honeybush tea, is a shrub belonging to the genus Cyclopia. The species is endemic to the Eastern Cape and occurs in the Vanstadensberg. It has a range of 31 km^{2} in which only three fragmented subpopulations remain after plantations were established. The plant is part of the fynbos and is further threatened by invasive plants and uncontrolled fires.

The tree's FSA number is 224.2.
