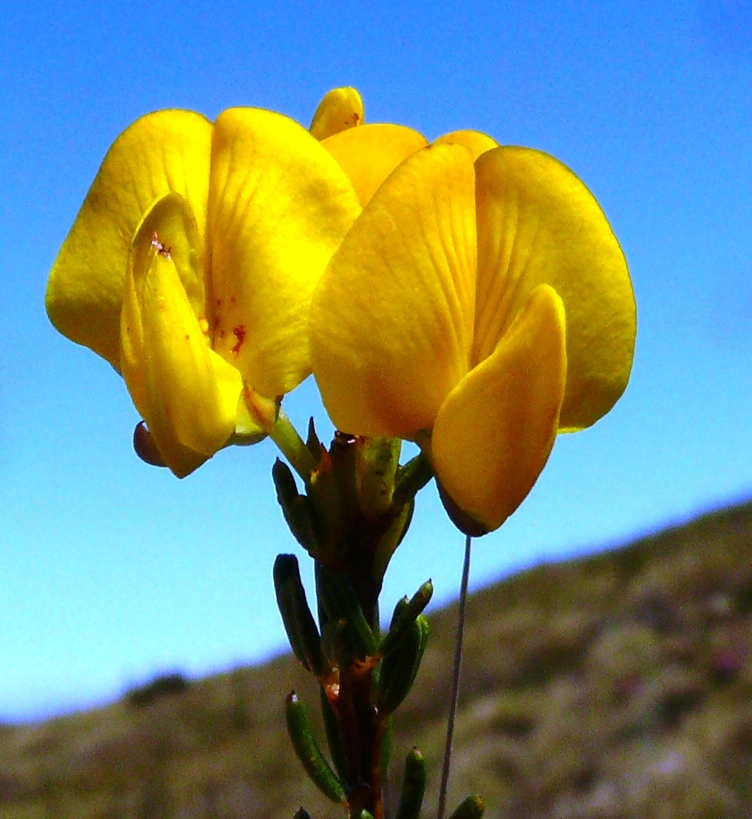

Scientific classification
- Kingdom: Plantae
- Clade: Tracheophytes
- Clade: Angiosperms
- Clade: Eudicots
- Clade: Rosids
- Order: Fabales
- Family: Fabaceae
- Subfamily: Faboideae
- Genus: Cyclopia
- Species: C. alpina

Binomial name
- Cyclopia alpina A.L.Schutte
- Distribution map

Synonyms
- Cyclopia genistoides var. ovalifolia Kies

= Cyclopia alpina =

Species of plant

Cyclopia alpina, the alpine honeybush, is a shrub belonging to the genus Cyclopia. The species is endemic to the Western Cape and occurs in the Hottentots Holland Mountains, Hex River Mountains and the Wemmershoek Mountains in the west and the Kammanassie Mountains. It grows at altitudes of 1 170 - 2 070 m. The plant is part of the fynbos.
