= Cyclopia subternata =

Scientific classification
- Kingdom: Plantae
- Clade: Tracheophytes
- Clade: Angiosperms
- Clade: Eudicots
- Clade: Rosids
- Order: Fabales
- Family: Fabaceae
- Subfamily: Faboideae
- Genus: Cyclopia
- Species: C. subternata

Binomial name
- Cyclopia subternata Vogel
- Distribution map

Synonyms
- Cyclopia grandiflora A.DC.; Cyclopia grandifolia Benth.; Cyclopia vogelii Harv.; Cyclopia vogelii var. subternata (Vogel) Harv.

Species of plant

Cyclopia subternata, the vlei honeybush, is a shrub belonging to the genus Cyclopia. The species is endemic to the Western Cape and occurs from the Langeberg to the Tsitsikamma Mountains. It has a range of 5 200 km^{2} and although it is still abundant, the population is declining due to the fact that it is over-collected by tea traders. The plant is part of the fynbos and a protection program is needed to preserve the plant; it does not resprout after the branches have been picked.

The tree's FSA number is 224.4.
