= Cyclopia laxiflora =

Scientific classification
- Kingdom: Plantae
- Clade: Tracheophytes
- Clade: Angiosperms
- Clade: Eudicots
- Clade: Rosids
- Order: Fabales
- Family: Fabaceae
- Subfamily: Faboideae
- Genus: Cyclopia
- Species: C. laxiflora

Binomial name
- Cyclopia laxiflora Benth.
- Distribution map

Synonyms
- Cyclopia latifolia Eckl. & Zeyh.; Cyclopia subternata var. laxiflora (Benth.) Kies; Cyclopia vogelii var. laxiflora (Benth.) Harv.

Species of plant

Cyclopia laxiflora is a shrub belonging to the genus Cyclopia. The species is endemic to the Western Cape and occurs from Knysna to Plettenberg Bay. It was last seen in the late 1800s and is considered possibly extinct. The plant is part of the fynbos and may have been wiped out by coastal development.
