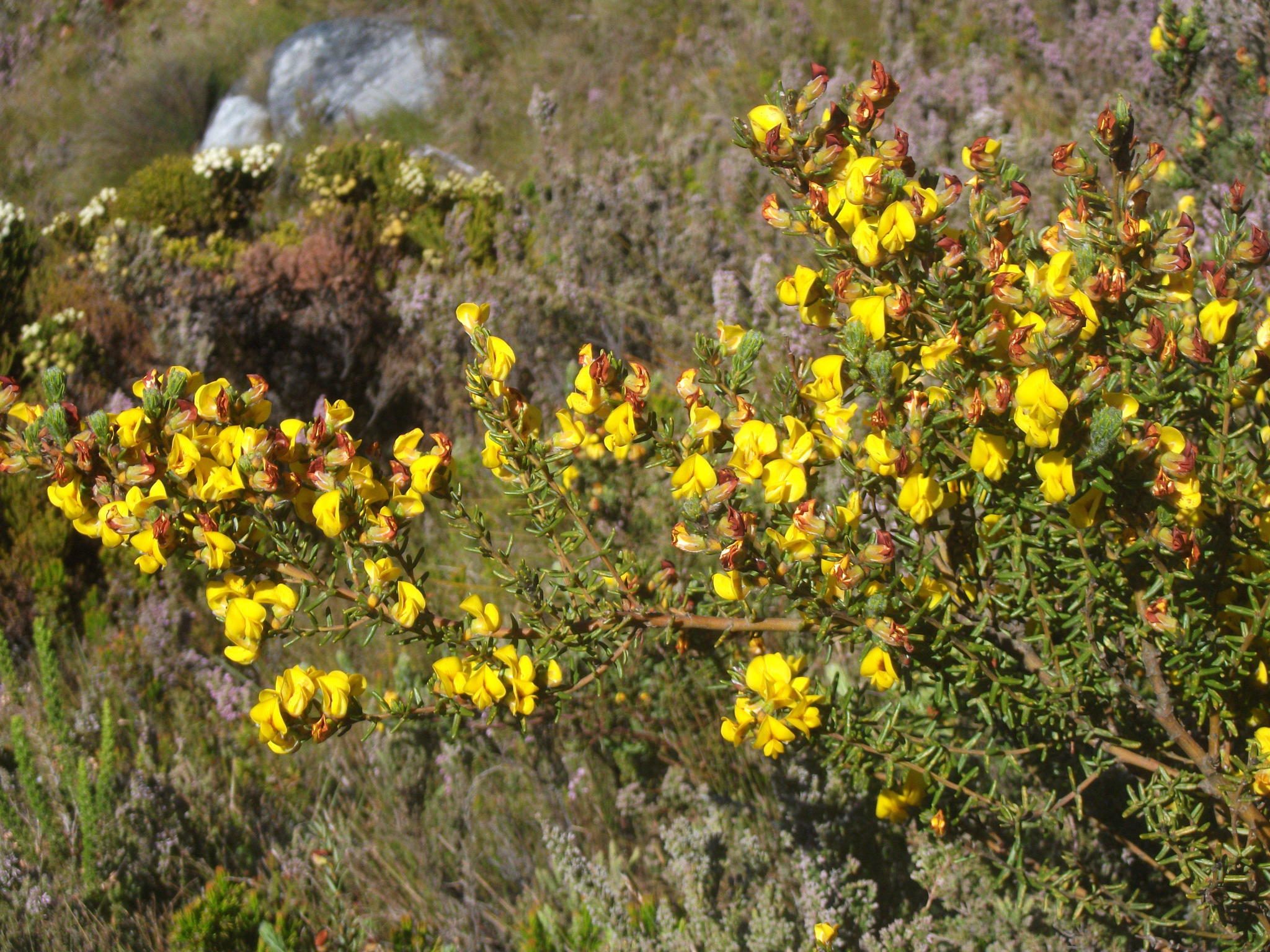

Scientific classification
- Kingdom: Plantae
- Clade: Tracheophytes
- Clade: Angiosperms
- Clade: Eudicots
- Clade: Rosids
- Order: Fabales
- Family: Fabaceae
- Subfamily: Faboideae
- Genus: Cyclopia
- Species: C. bowieana

Binomial name
- Cyclopia bowieana Harv.
- Distribution map

Synonyms
- Cyclopia ashtonii Hofmeyr & E.Phillips

= Cyclopia bowieana =

Species of plant

Cyclopia bowieana, the vlei honeybush tea, is a shrub belonging to the genus Cyclopia. The species is endemic to the Western Cape and occurs in the Langeberg and Outeniqua Mountains at altitudes of 1220 - 1840 m. The plant is part of the fynbos.
