= Erica flacca =

Scientific classification
- Kingdom: Plantae
- Clade: Tracheophytes
- Clade: Angiosperms
- Clade: Eudicots
- Clade: Asterids
- Order: Ericales
- Family: Ericaceae
- Genus: Erica
- Species: E. flacca

Binomial name
- Erica flacca E.Mey. ex Benth.

Synonyms
- Erica thymoides Klotzsch ex Benth.; Ericoides flaccum (E.Mey. ex Benth.) Kuntze

Species of flowering plant

Erica flacca is a plant that belongs to the genus Erica and forms part of the fynbos. The species is endemic to the Western Cape.
