= Ernestia (plant) =

Scientific classification
- Kingdom: Plantae
- Clade: Embryophytes
- Clade: Tracheophytes
- Clade: Spermatophytes
- Clade: Angiosperms
- Clade: Eudicots
- Clade: Rosids
- Order: Myrtales
- Family: Melastomataceae
- Genus: Ernestia; DC.

Synonyms
- Dichaetandra Naudin

Genus of flowering plants

Ernestia is a genus of plant in family Melastomataceae.

Its native range is tropical South America and it is found in the countries of Brazil (north), Colombia, French Guiana, Guyana, Peru, Suriname and Venezuela.

The genus name of Ernestia is in honour of Ernst Heinrich Friedrich Meyer (1791–1858), a German botanist and botanical historian, it was first described and published by Augustin-Pyramus de Candolle in Prodr. Vol.3 on page 121 in 1828.

== Species ==
According to Kew;

- Ernestia adenotricha L.Uribe
- Ernestia blackii Brade & Markgr.
- Ernestia cataractae Tutin
- Ernestia confertiflora Wurdack
- Ernestia goudotii Triana
- Ernestia granvillei Wurdack
- Ernestia karuruana Wurdack
- Ernestia maguirei Wurdack
- Ernestia minor Gleason
- Ernestia ovata Cogn.
- Ernestia quadriseta O.Berg ex Triana
- Ernestia rubra Pulle
- Ernestia tenella (Bonpl.) DC.
