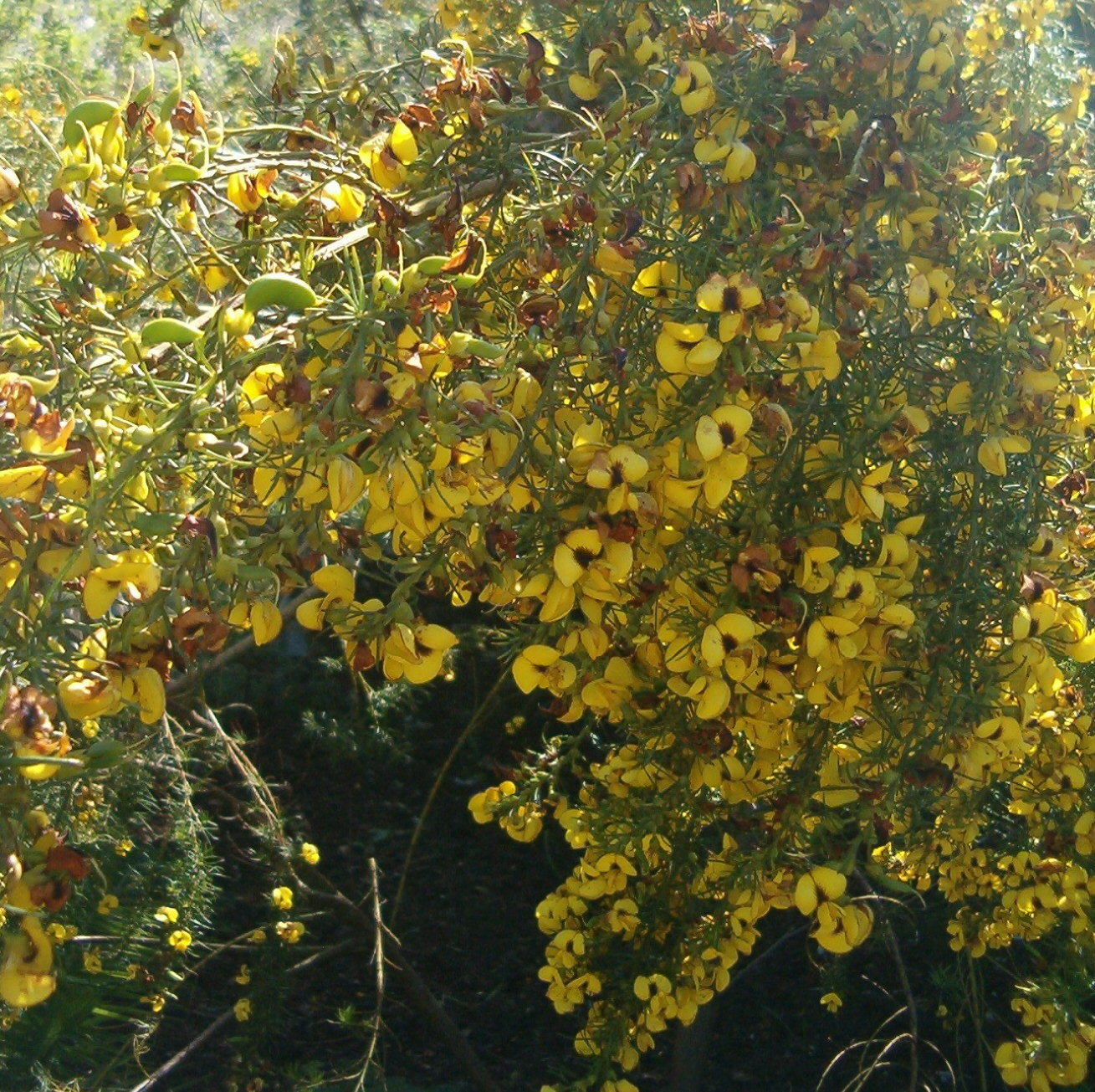
- Cyclopia meyeriana

Scientific classification
- Kingdom: Plantae
- Clade: Tracheophytes
- Clade: Angiosperms
- Clade: Eudicots
- Clade: Rosids
- Order: Fabales
- Family: Fabaceae
- Subfamily: Faboideae
- Tribe: Podalyrieae
- Genus: Cyclopia; Vent.

Sections and species
- See text
- Cyclopia is endemic to South Africa.

Synonyms
- Ibbetsonia Sims

= Cyclopia (plant) =

Genus of legumes

Cyclopia, the honeybush, or heuningbos in Afrikaans, is a genus of some 20 species of flowering plants in the legume family Fabaceae, subfamily Faboideae. Species of the genus are native to the southern and southwestern Cape Provinces of South Africa.

Its description was published by the French botanist Étienne Pierre Ventenat in 1808. The name Ibbetsonia, published two years later, is regarded as a synonym of this genus; John Sims had commemorated the physiologist Agnes Ibbetson with this name.

== Cultivation and use ==
The leaves of honeybush are commonly used to make herbal teas. It grows only in small areas in the southwest and southeast of South Africa and has many similarities with rooibos. Honeybush and rooibos are considered types of red tea.

Honeybush is so named because the flowers smell of honey. The taste of honeybush tea is similar to that of rooibos but a little sweeter. In some rural districts, it used to be common practice to keep a kettle of honeybush tea infusing on the stove ready for drinking while scenting the whole house—unlike tea prepared from Camellia sinensis, the product does not turn bitter with long-term simmering.

There are dozens of species of honeybush tea found in the wild, of which about four or five are in widespread home or commercial use. These are:

- Cyclopia intermedia, known as 'bergtee' (mountain tea), found between Port Elizabeth and the edge of the Langkloof
- Cyclopia genistoides, known as 'kustee' (coastal tea), found mostly in the Western Cape near Yzerfontein and Darling and also thriving in the South Cape if cultivated
- Cyclopia maculata, grown in the Outeniqua area near George
- Cyclopia sessiliflora, known as 'Heidelberg-tee', named after the town Heidelberg in South Africa, where it grows in the local mountain range
- Cyclopia subternata, known as 'vleitee' (marshland tea) or 'valleitee' (valley tea)
- Cyclopia longifolia

Some species can be cultivated whereas others have resisted all attempts at cultivation and must be harvested in the wild. It is not always easy to discover what the seeds need to enable them to germinate; some kinds bear elaiosomes and might be dependent on the services of particular ants or birds. Cyclopia intermedia (mountain tea) is one of the teas that is harvested in the Kouga mountains where it grows naturally. Mountain tea regenerates within three years after harvesting or devastation by fire; consequently less than one third of the mountain yield is available for harvesting each year by rotation.

Mountain tea and valley tea flower in September/October whereas coastal tea flowers in May/June.

=== Tea preparation ===
There are two methods of processing honeybush for use in tea. In the traditional method, the leaves of the bush are harvested, cut and bruised (often with mechanical rollers), and then left in the sun to oxidise. The modern, industrialised process oxidises the leaves in rotating, heated tanks at temperatures of 70–90 °C for two to three days. The leaves are then air-dried.

Afterwards, the leaves are sifted and graded according to the application:

- Super Fine (mostly used for string-and-tag tea bags)
- Regular Fine (mostly used for swimming tea bags or loose tea application)
- Coarse (mostly used for loose tea application)

== Chemistry ==
Honeybush is low in tannin (0.45%). Some of the bioactive compounds present in honeybush include:

- isoflavones
- flavones
- cinnamic acids
- coumestans
- xanthonoids
- mangiferin and isomangiferin (Cyclopia subternata)

== Species ==
Cyclopia comprises the following species:

=== Section Aequalis ===
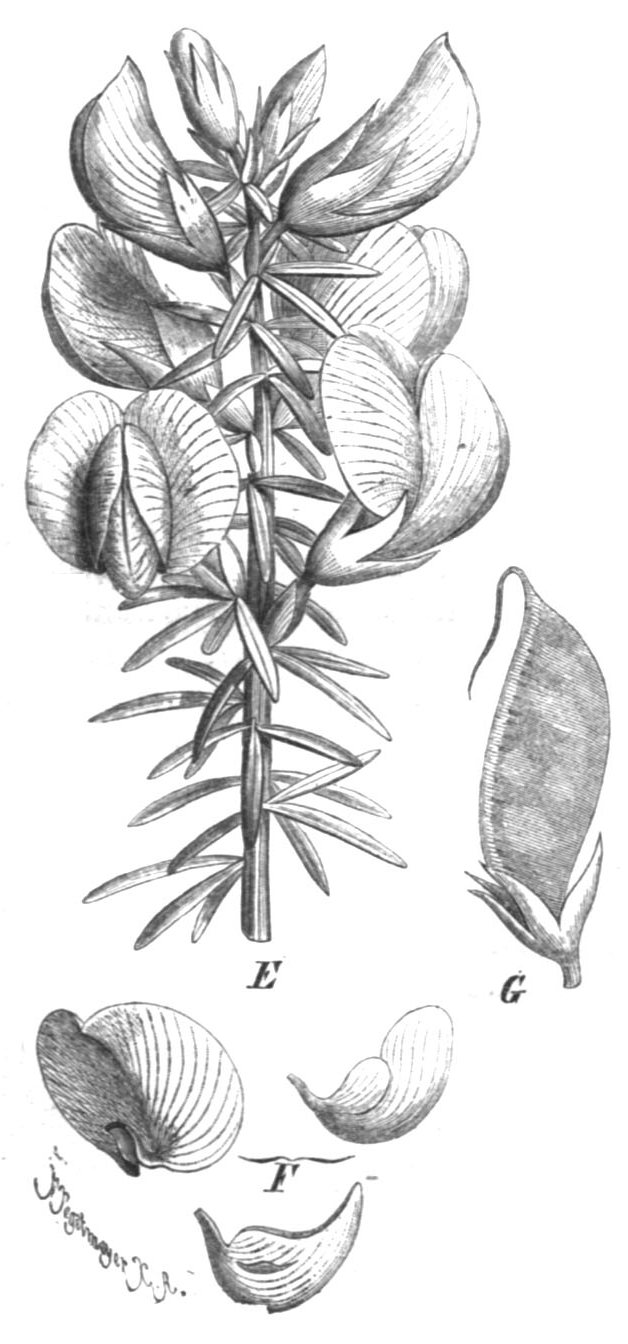
Cyclopia genistoides

- Cyclopia burtonii Hofmeyr & E. Phillips
- Cyclopia buxifolia (Burm. f.) Kies
- Cyclopia laxiflora Benth.

=== Section Cyclopia ===
- Cyclopia alpina A.L. Schutte
- Cyclopia falcata (Harv.) Kies (= Cyclopia subternata Vogel)
- Cyclopia galioides (Bergius) DC.
- Cyclopia genistoides (L.) Vent.
- Cyclopia intermedia E. Mey.

=== Section Marsupium ===
- Cyclopia latifolia DC.
- Cyclopia sessiliflora Eckl. & Zeyh.
- Cyclopia squamosa A.L. Schutte

=== Section Praegnans ===
- Cyclopia alopecuroides A.L. Schutte
- Cyclopia aurescens Kies
- Cyclopia bolusii Hofmeyr & E. Phillips
- Cyclopia bowieana Harv.
- Cyclopia glabra (Hofmeyr & E. Phillips) A.L. Schutte
- Cyclopia meyeriana Walp.

=== Section Truncatae ===
- Cyclopia filiformis Kies
- Cyclopia longifolia Vogel
- Cyclopia maculata (Andrews) Kies
- Cyclopia plicata Kies
- Cyclopia pubescens Eckl. & Zeyh.
