= Ernst Heinrich Friedrich Meyer =

German botanist (1791-1858)

- Born: 1 January 1791; Electorate of Hanover
- Died: 7 August 1858 (aged 67); Königsberg, East Prussia
- Known for: Botanist, Botanical historian, Specialist in Juncaceae
- Notable work: Geschichte der Botanik
- Scientific career
- Fields: Botany history of science

Ernst Heinrich Friedrich Meyer (1 January 1791 – 7 August 1858) was a German botanist and botanical historian. Born in the Electorate of Hanover, he lectured in Göttingen and in 1826 became a professor of botany at the University of Königsberg, as well as Director of the Botanical Garden. His botanical specialty was the Juncaceae – a family of rushes. His major work was the four-volume Geschichte der Botanik ("History of Botany", 1854–57). His history covered ancient authorities such as Aristotle and Theophrastus, explored the beginnings of modern botany in the context of 15th- and 16th-century intellectual practice, and offered a wealth of biographical data on early modern botanists. Julius von Sachs pronounced him "no great botanist" but admitted that he "possessed a clever and cultivated intellect."

He died in Königsberg, East Prussia.

In 1828, he was honoured by Swiss botanist Augustin Pyramus de Candolle who named a genus of plants from tropical South America after him, Ernestia.

This botanist is denoted by the author abbreviation E.Mey. when citing a botanical name.
