= Cyclopia =

Extreme form of holoprosencephaly

- Other names: Cyclocephaly, synophthalmia, monophthalmia
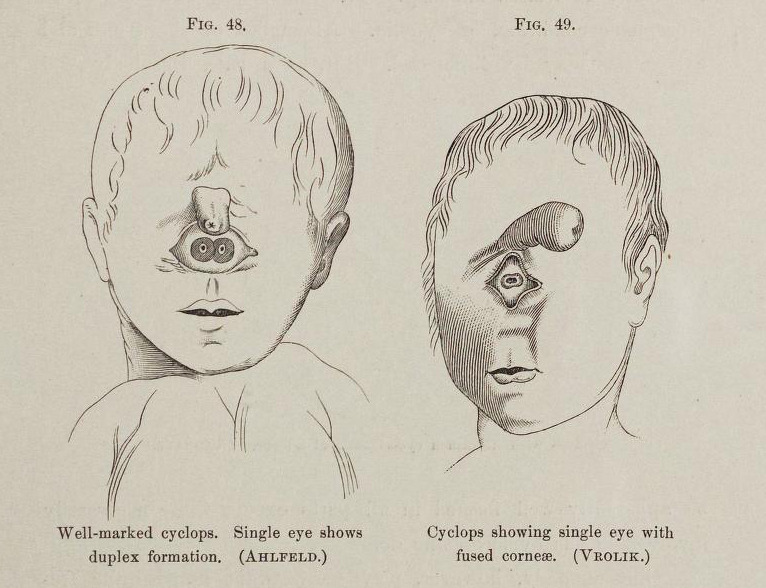
- Fetuses with cyclopia
- Specialty: Medical genetics
- Usual onset: During embryonic development
- Duration: Lifelong
- Prognosis: Invariably fatal
- Frequency: 1 in 100,000 births

Cyclopia (named after the Greek mythological characters cyclopes), also known as alobar holoprosencephaly, is the most extreme form of holoprosencephaly and is a congenital disorder (birth defect) characterized by the failure of the embryonic prosencephalon to properly divide the orbits of the eye into two cavities. Its incidence is 1 in 16,000 in born animals and 1 in 200 in miscarried fetuses.

== Signs and symptoms ==
Typically, the nose is either missing or not functional. This deformity (called proboscis) forms above the center eye and is characteristic of a form of cyclopia called rhinencephaly or rhinocephaly. Most such embryos are either naturally miscarried or stillborn upon delivery.

Although cyclopia is rare, several cyclopic human babies are preserved in medical museums (e.g. The Vrolik Museum, Amsterdam, Trivandrum Medical College).

Some extreme cases of cyclopia have been documented in farm animals (horses, sheep, pigs, goats, and sometimes chickens). In such cases, the nose and mouth fail to form, or the nose grows from the roof of the mouth, obstructing airflow and resulting in suffocation shortly after birth.

== Causes ==
Genetic defects or toxins can misdirect the embryonic forebrain-dividing process. One highly teratogenic alkaloid toxin that can cause cyclopia is cyclopamine or 2-deoxyjervine, found in the plant Veratrum californicum (also known as corn lily or false hellebore). Grazing animals are most likely to ingest this plant and induce cyclopia in offspring. People sometimes accidentally ingest false hellebore while pregnant thinking it is hellebore, which has been suggested as a "natural" treatment for vomiting, cramps, and poor circulation – three conditions which may be present in the early stages of pregnancy. Cyclopia occurs when certain proteins are inappropriately expressed, causing the brain to stay whole, rather than developing two distinct hemispheres. This leads to the fetus having one optic lobe and one olfactory lobe, resulting in the eye and nose malformations of cyclopia.

The Sonic hedgehog protein (SHH) is the gene regulator involved in the separation of the single eye field into two bilateral fields. Although not proven, it is thought that SHH emitted from the prechordal plate suppresses Pax6, which causes the eye field to divide into two. If the SHH gene is mutated, the result is cyclopia, a single eye in the center of the face (Gilbert, 2000).

== Notable cases ==
- A British description from 1665 of a colt that appeared to have cyclopia reads:
  First, That it had no sign of any Nose in the usual place, nor had it any, in any other place of the Head, unless the double Bagg CC that grew out of the midst of the forehead, were some rudiment of it. Next, That the two Eyes were united into one Double Eye which was placed just in the middle of the Brow.
- In October 1766, an infant in France was born with cyclopia, living for only a few hours. Reports of the case were made in the Mercure de France and an illustration of the infant was made by Marie Bihéron. The case was also mentioned in Volume IV of Buffon's L'Histoire Naturelle.

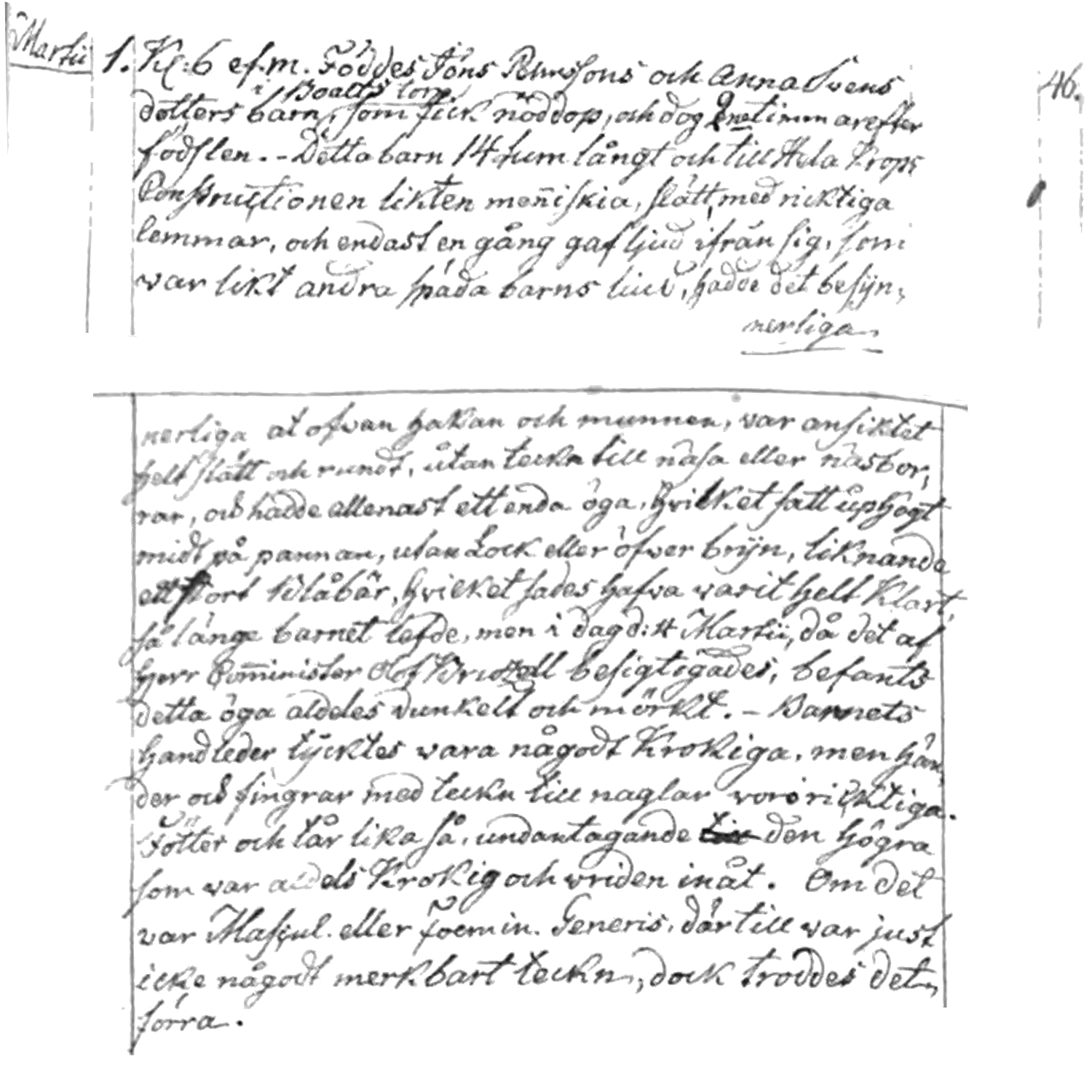
A Swedish description from 1793 of a newborn with cyclopia

- On 1 March 1793, a 46-year-old woman in Boalts Torp, Glimåkra, Sweden gave birth to a child with cyclopia that died after two hours. The child was 35 cm long, its face without nose and nostrils, and its lidless eye with no eyebrow sat raised on the middle of its forehead like a large blueberry. The wrists were somewhat crooked as well as the right foot which was completely crooked and bent inwards. It was not clear whether they were a boy or a girl, but they were believed to be the former.
- In November 1889, reports emerged from Umatilla County, Oregon, of a Nez Perce child with one eye in the center of the forehead. The child was reportedly healthy and "able to see with ease, and ran about with as much freedom as any of his companions." Several individuals tried to locate the child to be put on display, but the tribe had left to hunt in the mountains by the time they arrived. It is unknown what became of the child.
- On December 28, 2005, a kitten with cyclopia, "Cy", was born in Redmond, Oregon, United States and died about one day after birth.
- In 2006, a baby girl with cyclopia was born in Chennai, India. Her only eye was in the center of her forehead. She did not have a nose and her brain did not separate into two separate hemispheres (holoprosencephaly). She died approximately a month after her birth, surviving longer than any known previous case.
- A boy with one eye and no nose was born in India in 2011. The child died one day after his birth.
- In 2011, an albino cyclops shark fetus was discovered in the body of a caught shark in Mexico, with no discernible nose and one giant eye. The unborn fetus was turned over for medical studies.
- On October 10, 2012, a small kitten was born. Its eye was in the center of the forehead and there was no developed nose to be found. The small cat died shortly after it was born. It was nicknamed Cleyed the Cyclops.
- On May 10, 2017, in Assam, India, a black goat was born with one eye and other cyclopia-related facial abnormalities. It was reported to still be alive over a week later, which is unusual for this condition.
- On September 13, 2018, in Mandailing Natal, North Sumatra, Indonesia, a baby with cyclopia was born without a nose and one eye with the weight of 2.4kg (5.3lb) and heart rate under 100 bpm. The child died seven hours after birth.
- On March 16, 2022, a boy was born in Al Bayda, Yemen, with cyclopia. He died 7 hours after birth. He was seen in photos taken by Yemeni journalist Karim Zarai.
- In March 2024, a pig was born in Ilocos Sur, Philippines, with cyclopia.
- In December 2024, the Korean Society of Perinatology documented a female infant with cyclopia who survived for 8 months on palliative care, which is the longest known to date. The baby girl was born as part of a twin birth, with the other twin being reportedly normal.
- In November 2025, a kitten with cyclopia was born on a farm in Vilhena (located within the western state of Rondônia in Brazil).
- In November 2026, archaeologists announced the discovery of a 1,600-year-old Nazca infant skeleton in Peru with cyclopia.

== Cultural significance ==
The Islamic State used photos of babies born with cyclopia in its recruitment campaign. ISIS claimed the photos depicted Masih ad-Dajjal, who according to the Hadith, would have only one eye. Mainstream Islamic scholars consider the prophecy as referring to a one-eyed man, not a cyclops. One infant whose image was circulated in 2014 was claimed to be Israeli, but was actually Bolivian and from 2008. The baby girl from India born in 2006 (see notable cases above) also had her image used.

== Gallery ==
=== Humans ===
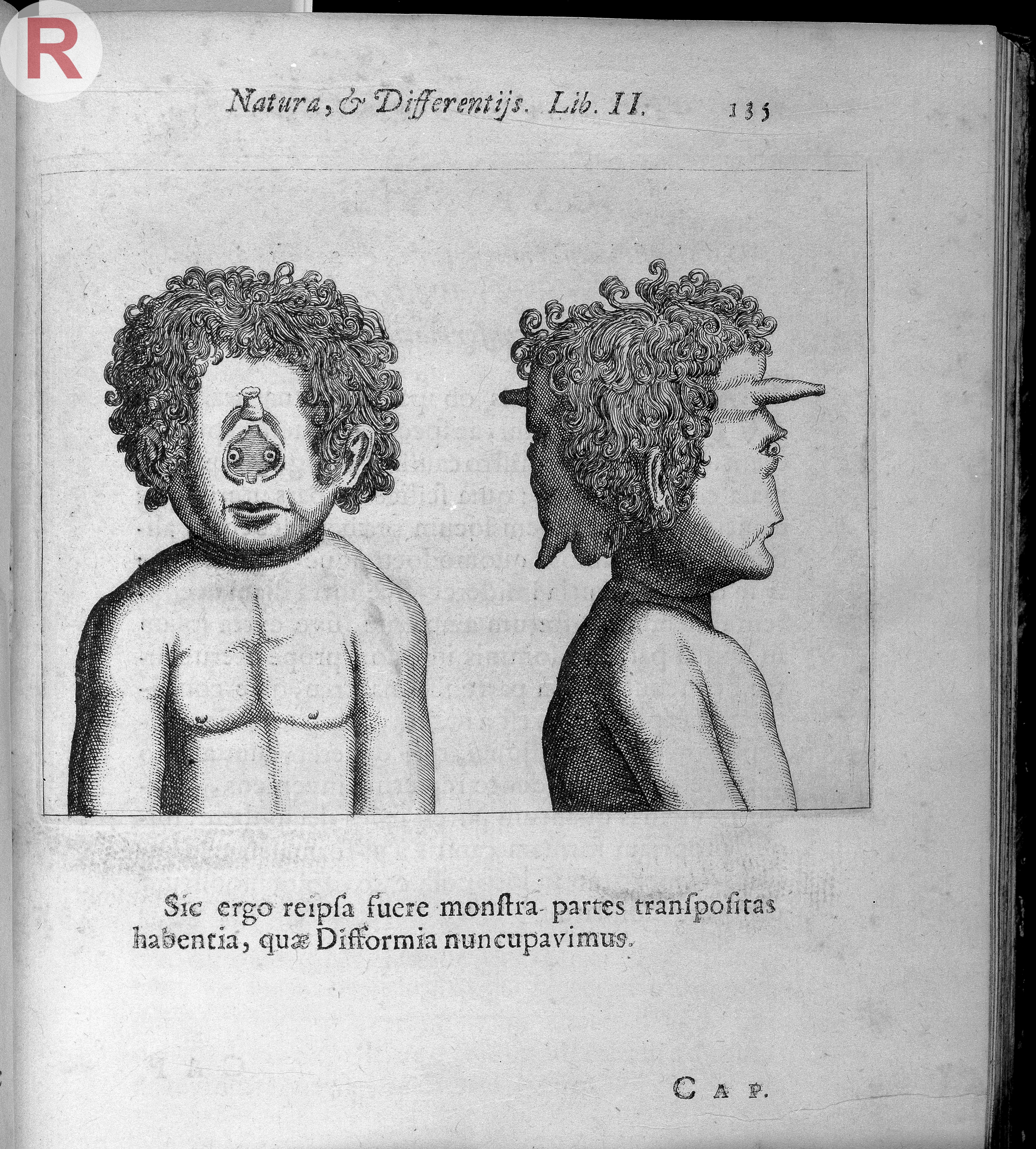
1616, Italy

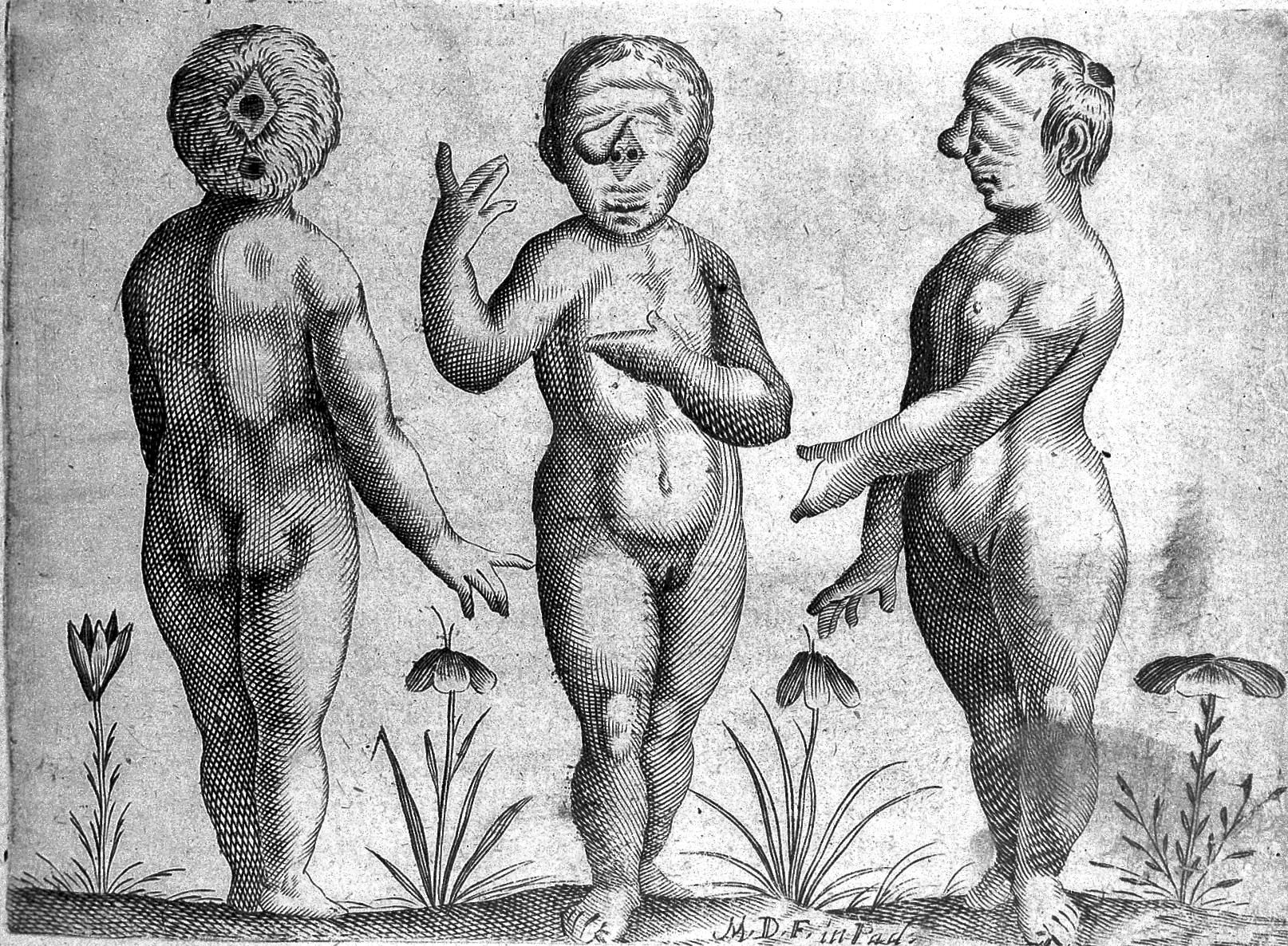
1634, Italy

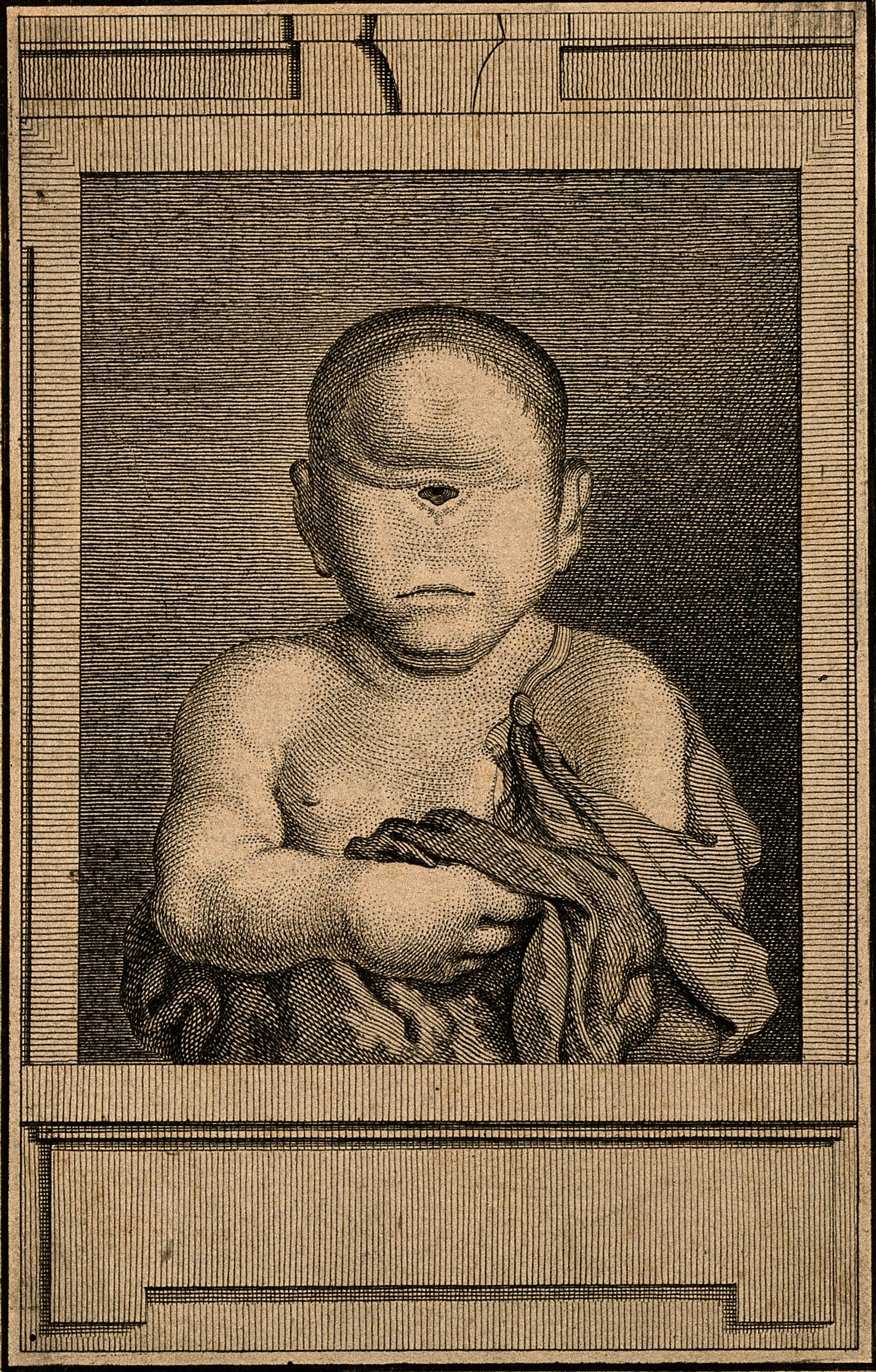
1766, France

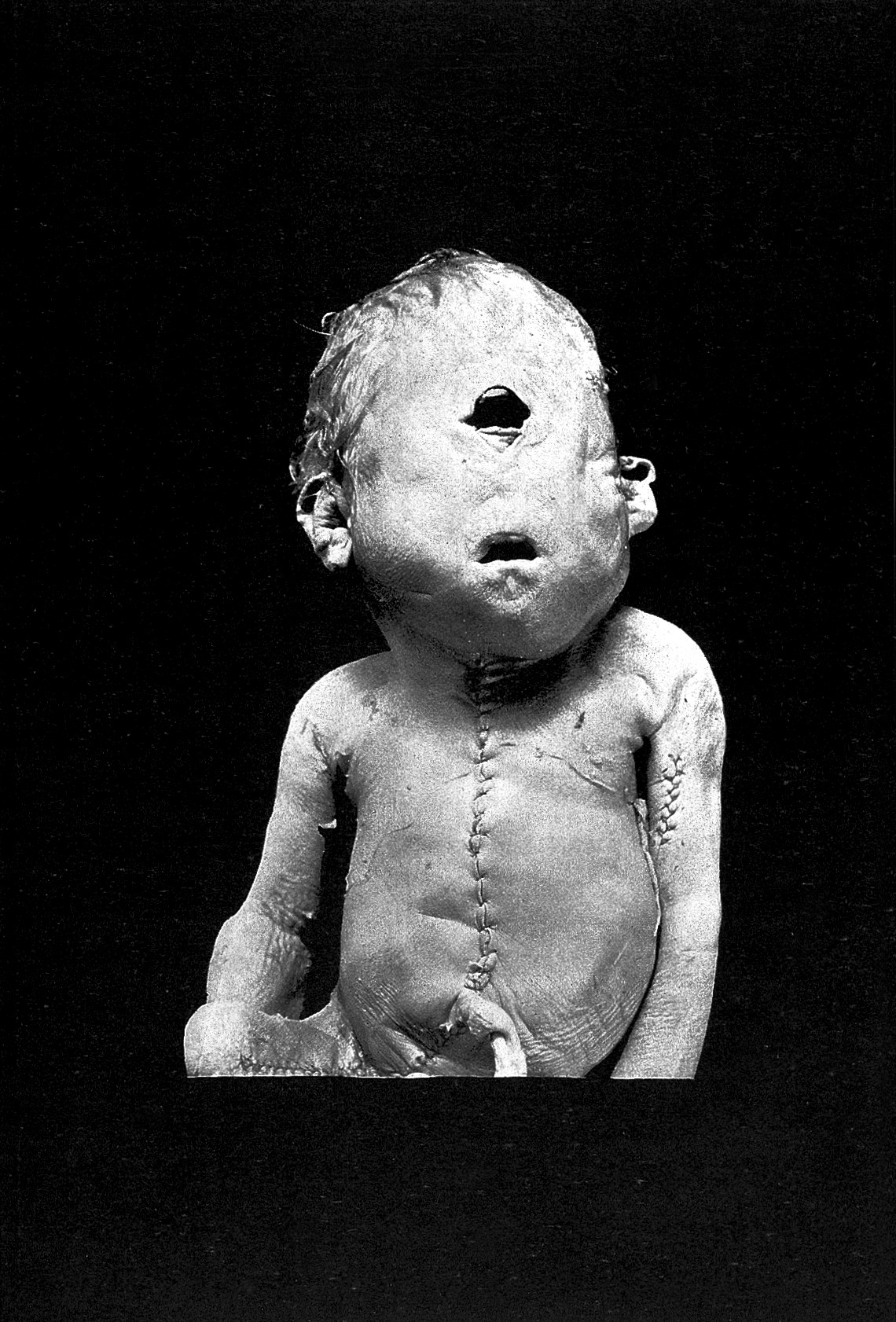
1893, United States

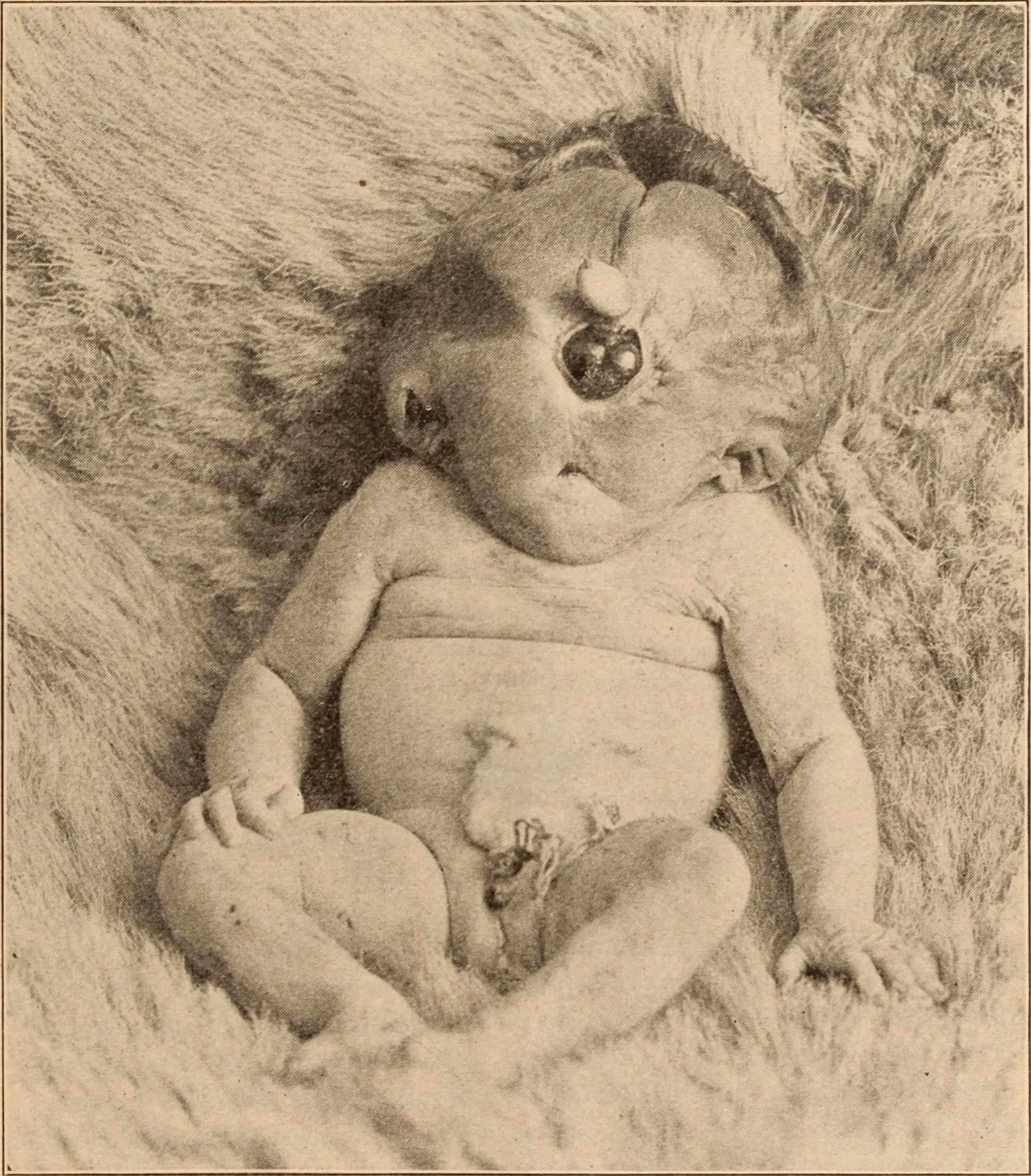
1900, United States

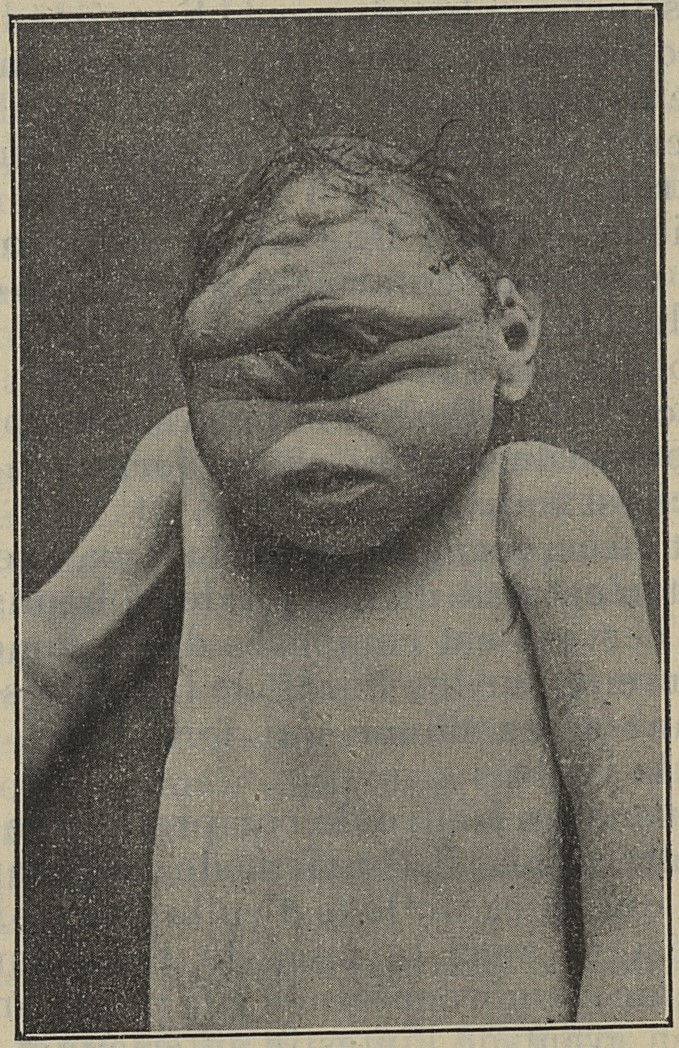
1909, France

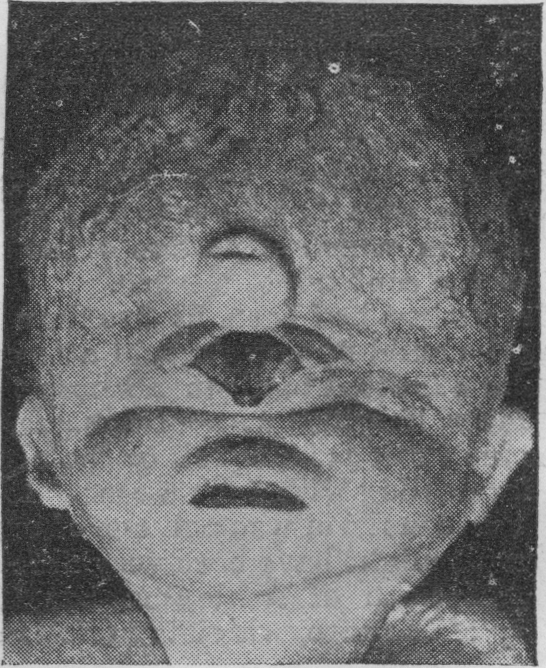
1912, United Kingdom

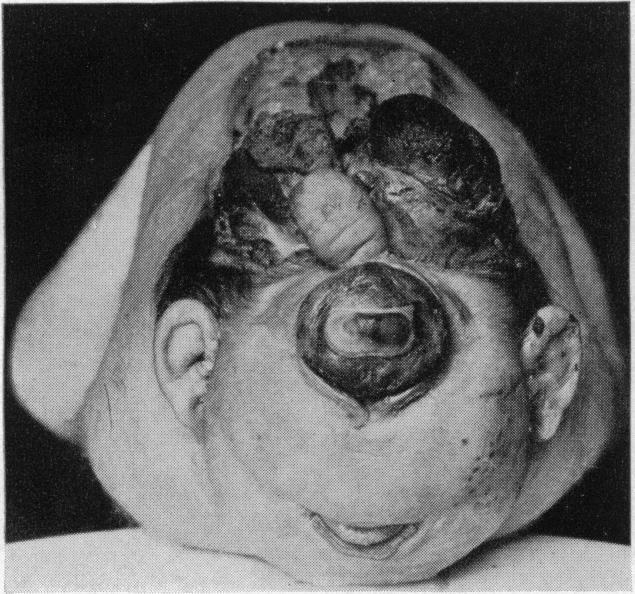
1920, United States

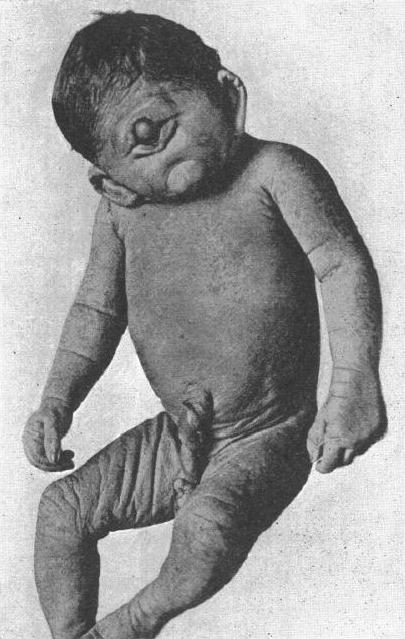
1926, Egypt

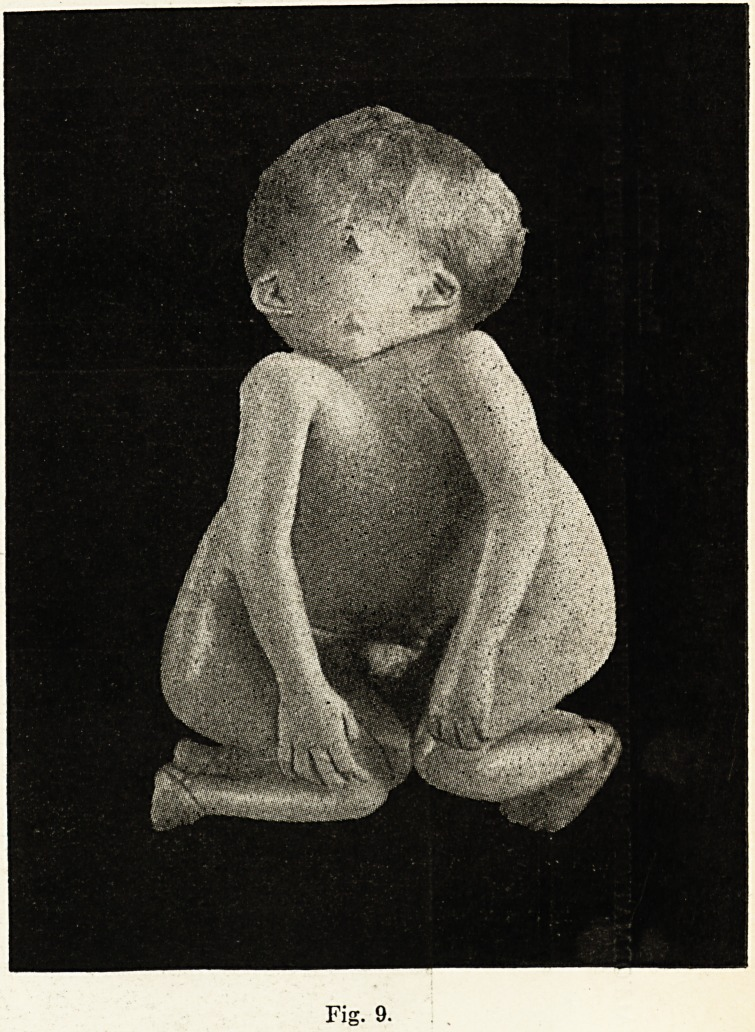
1950, India

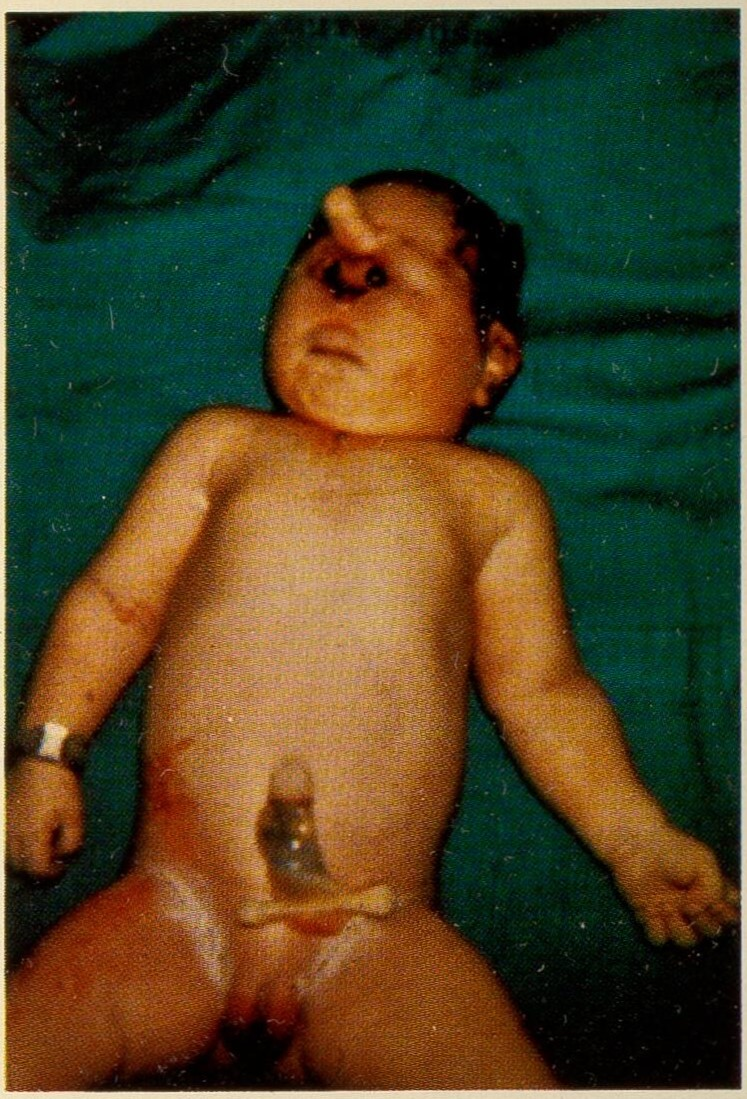
1968, United States

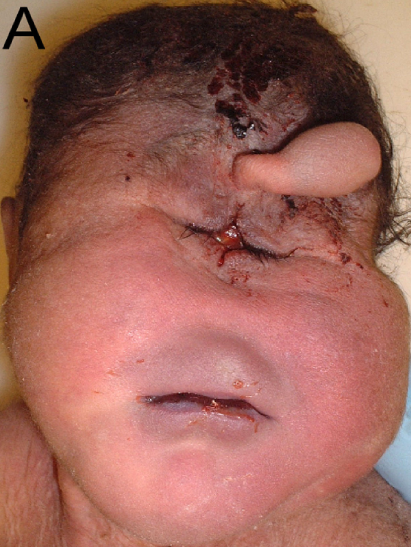
Patau syndrome

=== Animals ===
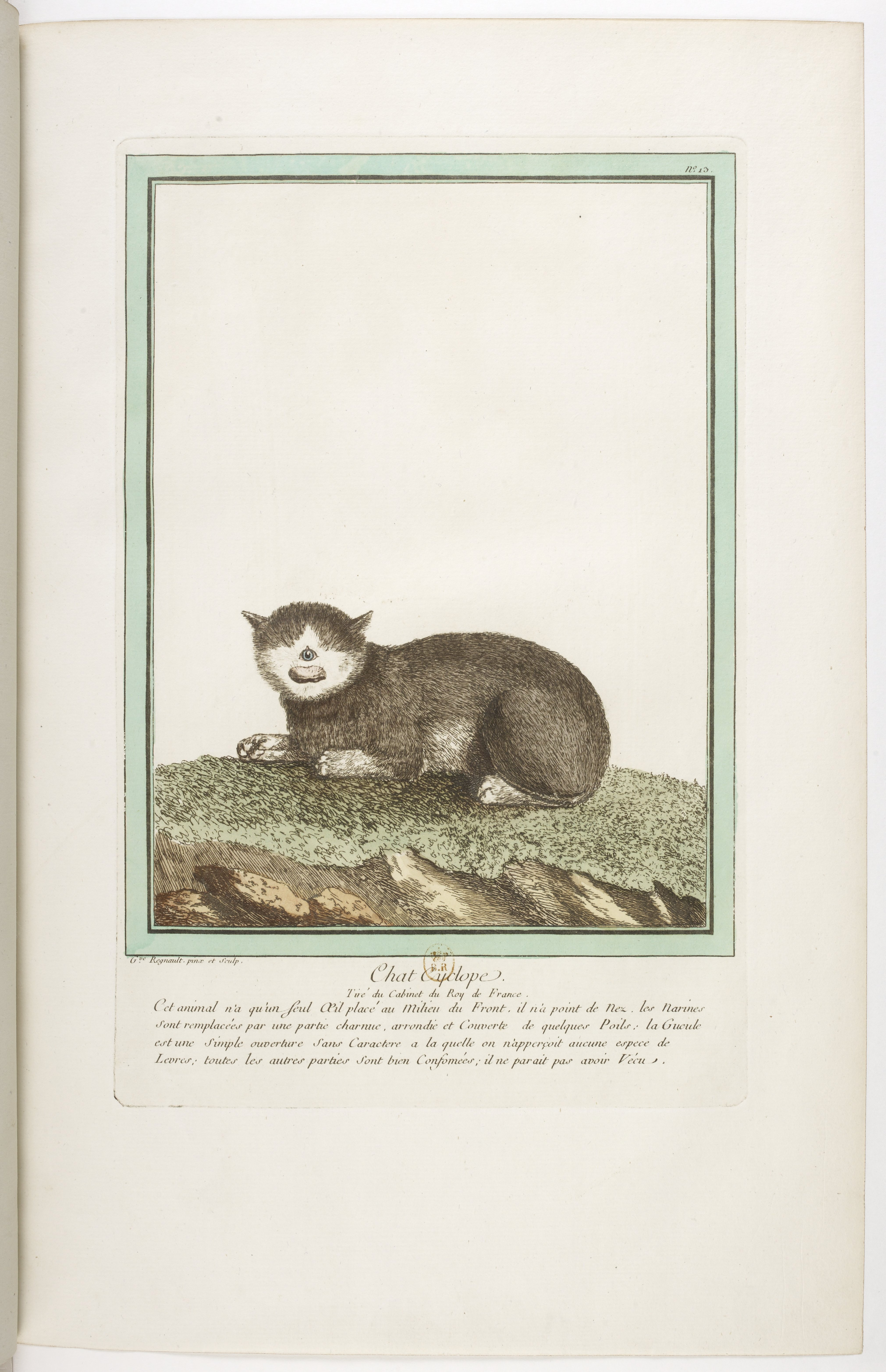
Cat, 1775

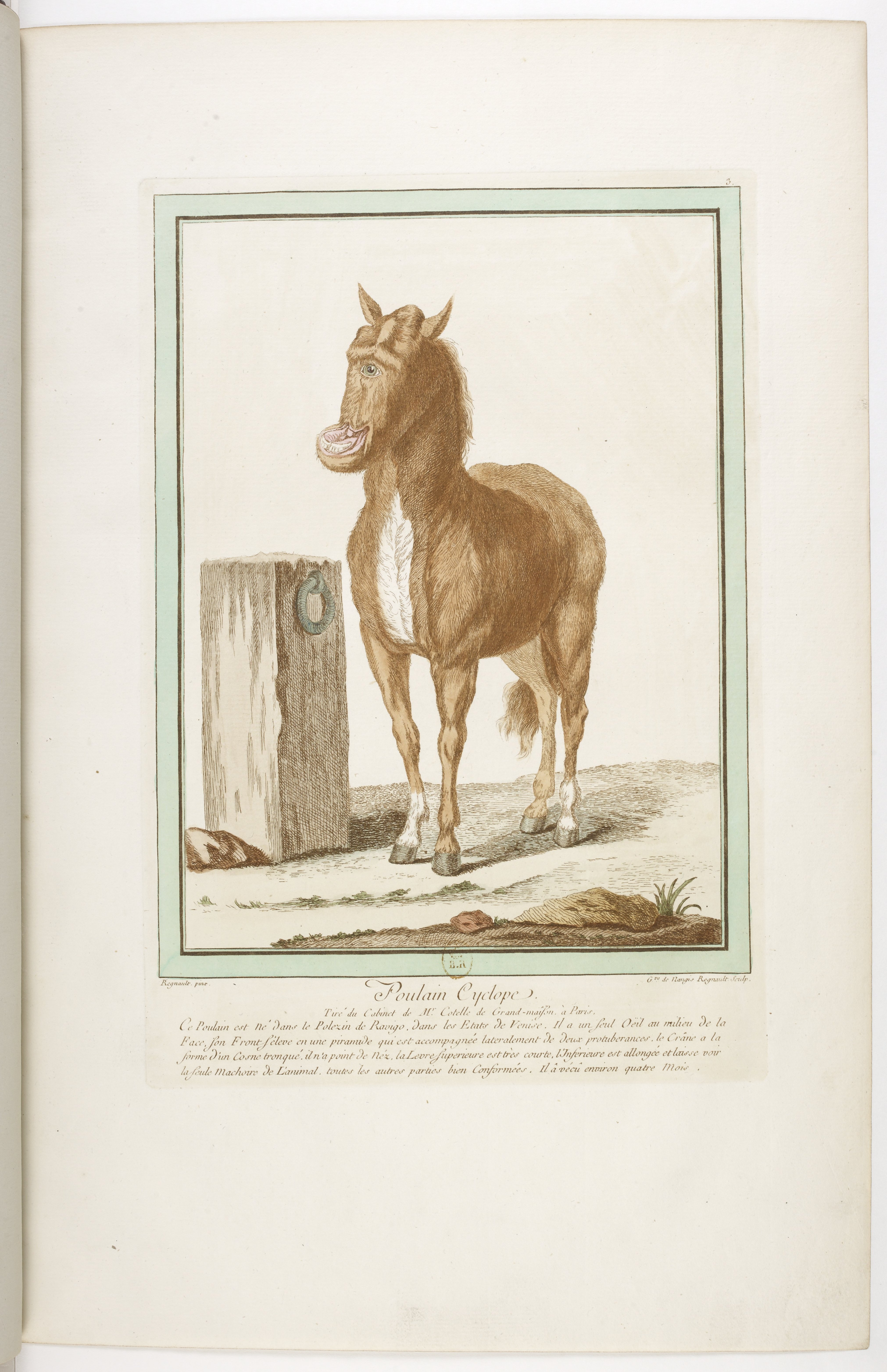
Horse, 1775

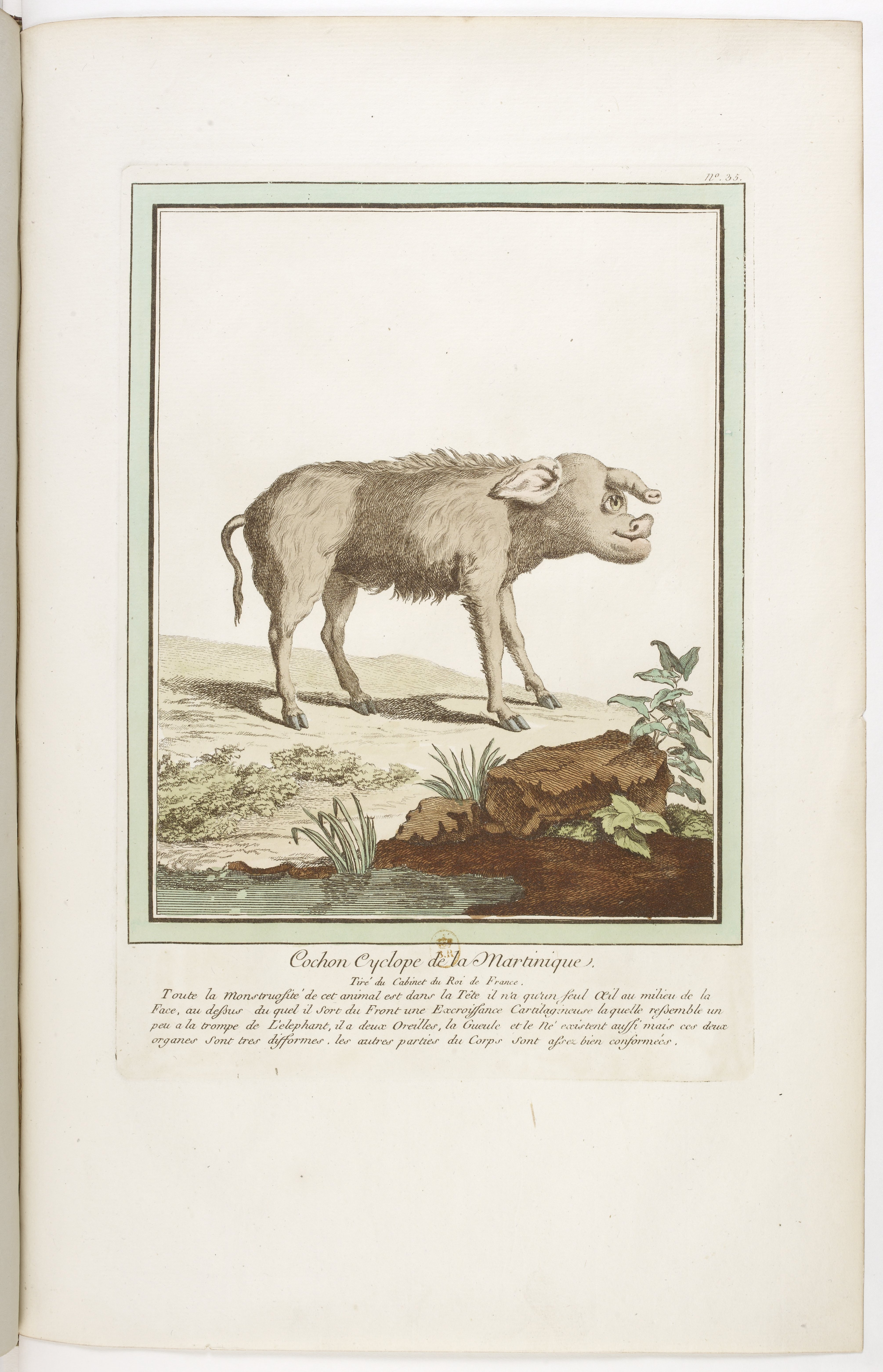
Pig from Martinique, 1775

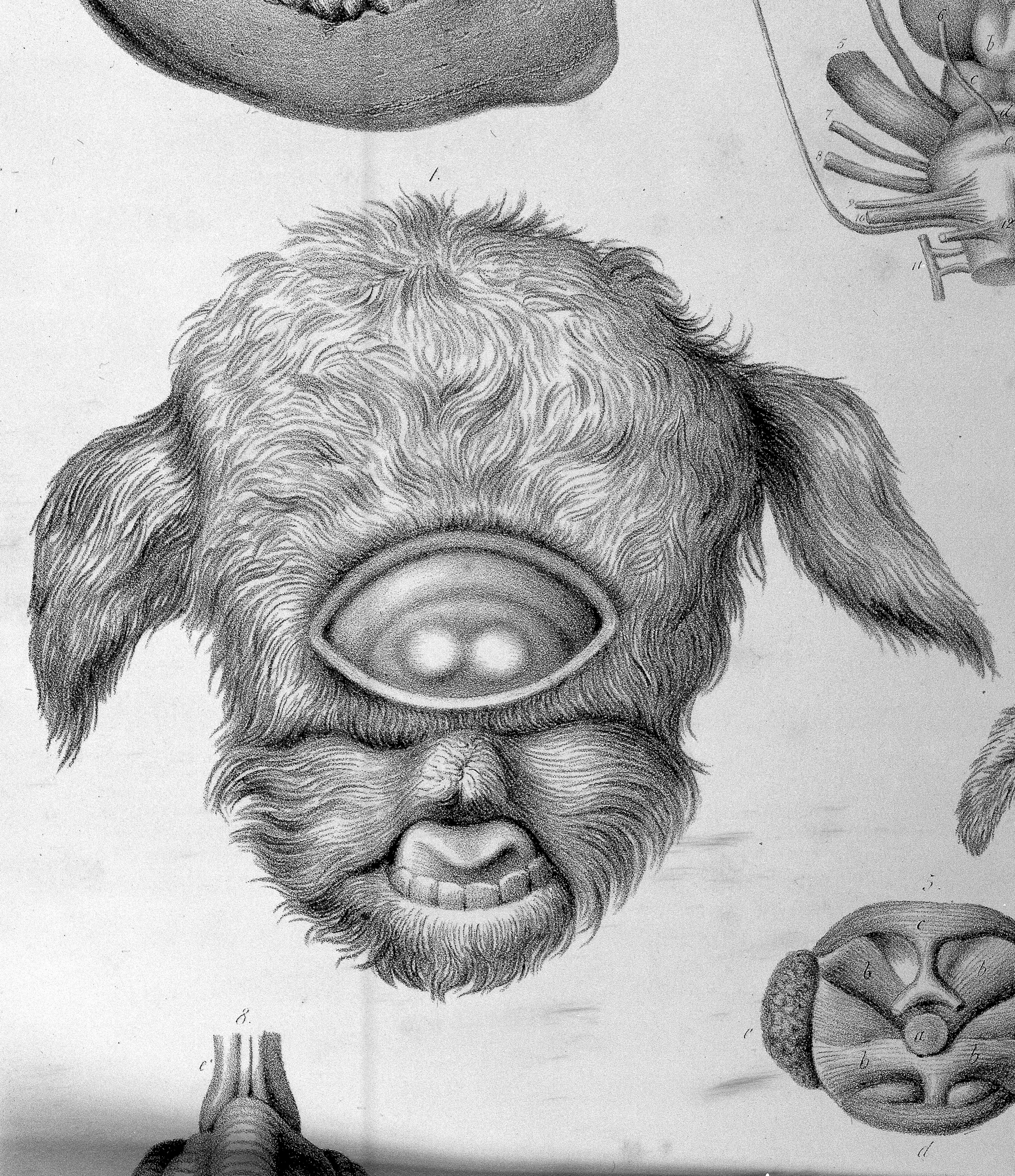
Goat, 1849

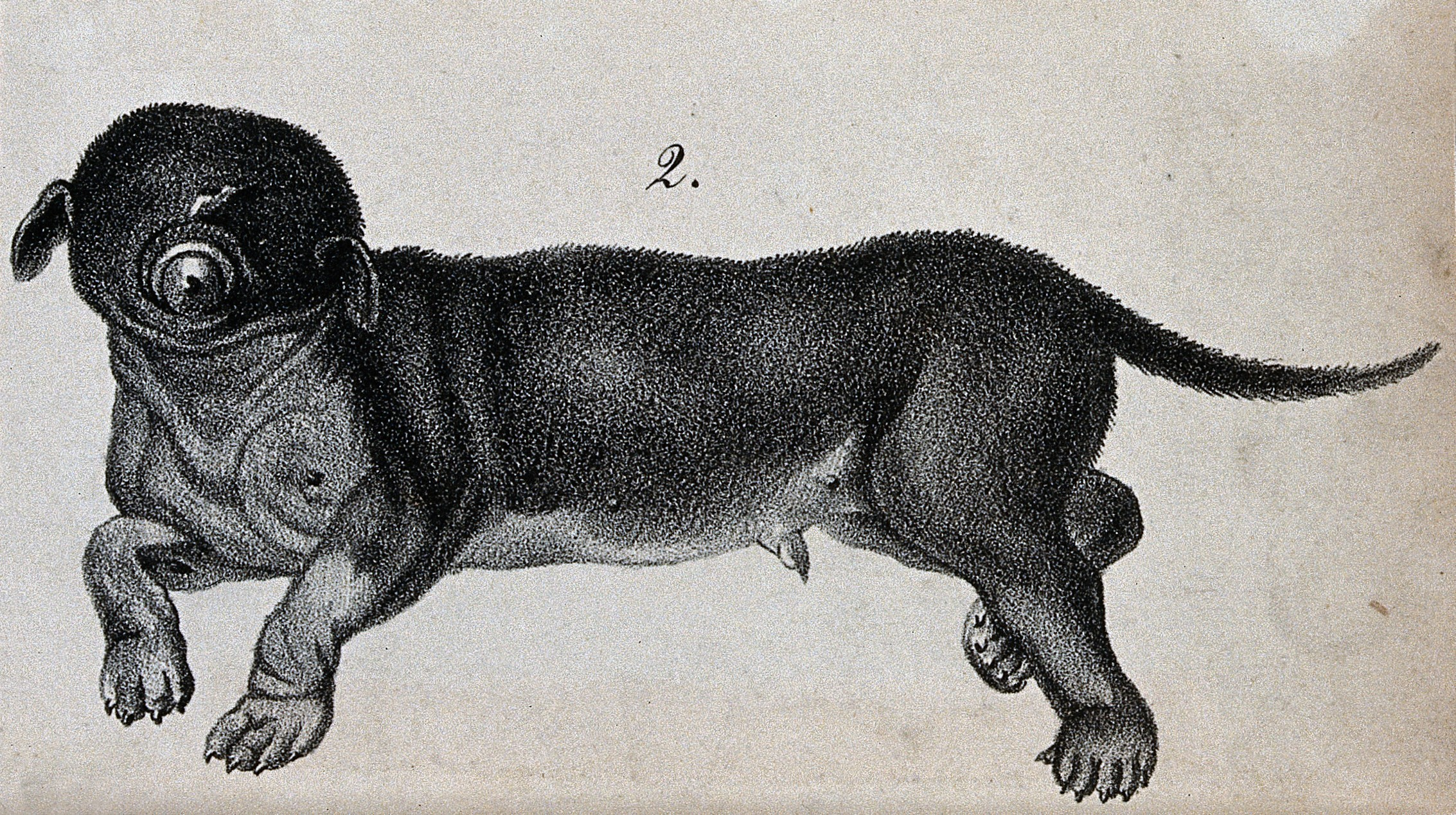
Dog

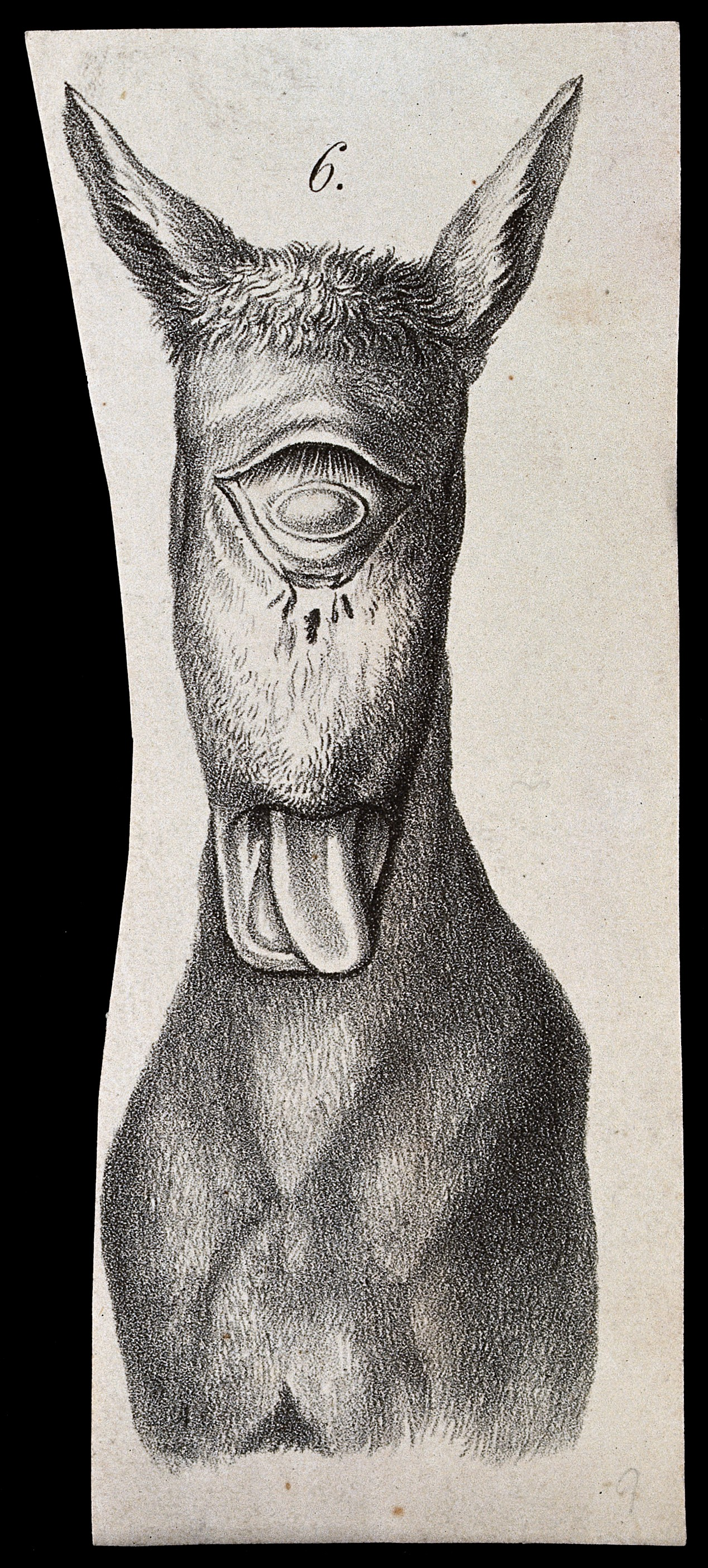
Donkey

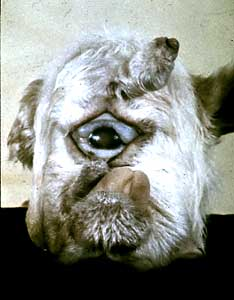
Sheep with in utero cyclopamine exposure

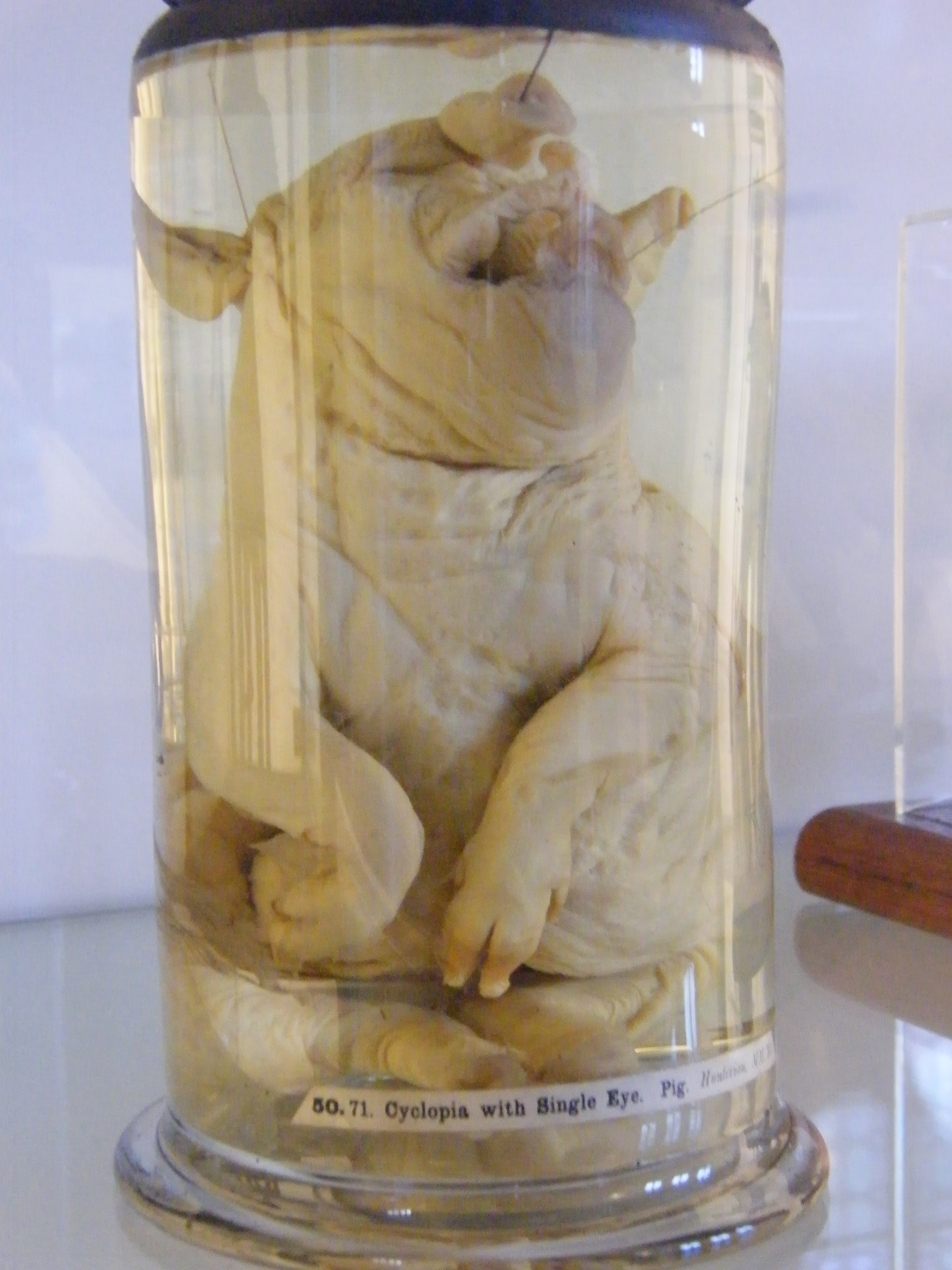
A pig at the Hunterian Museum, Glasgow

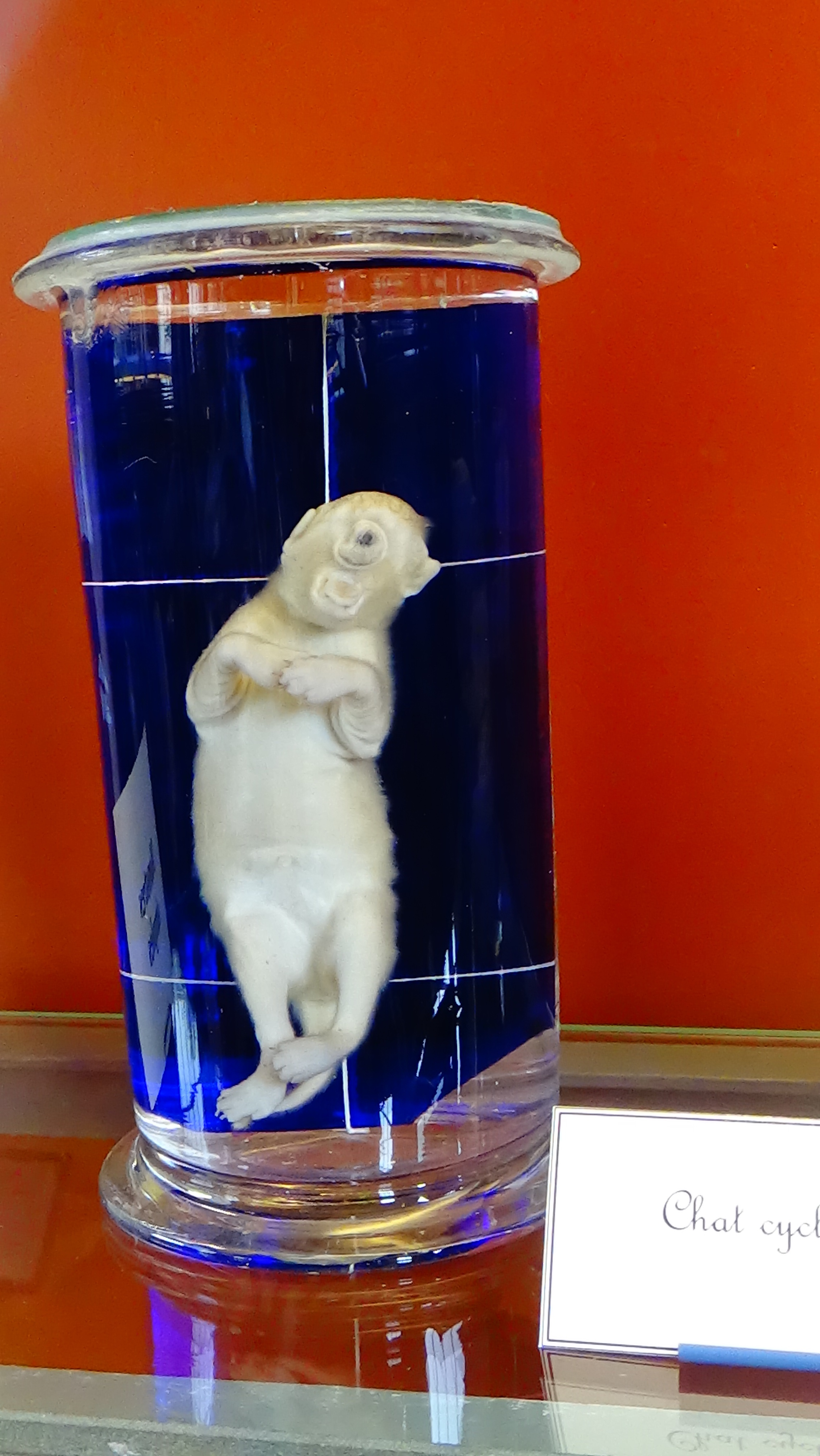
Cat in National Museum of Natural History

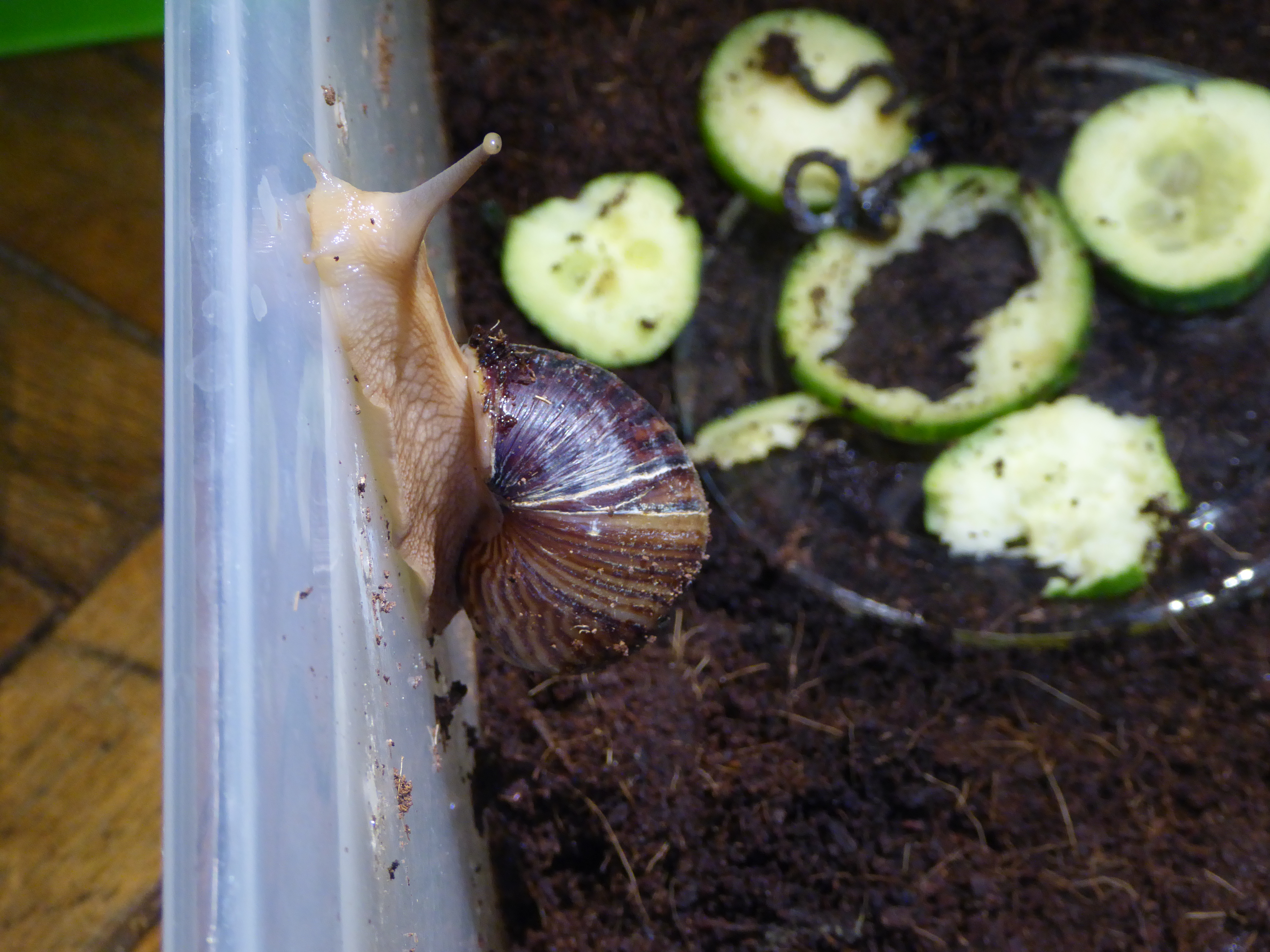
Lissachatina immaculata

== See also ==
- Anophthalmia
- Hedgehog pathway
