= Hermagor-Pressegger See =

- Municipality
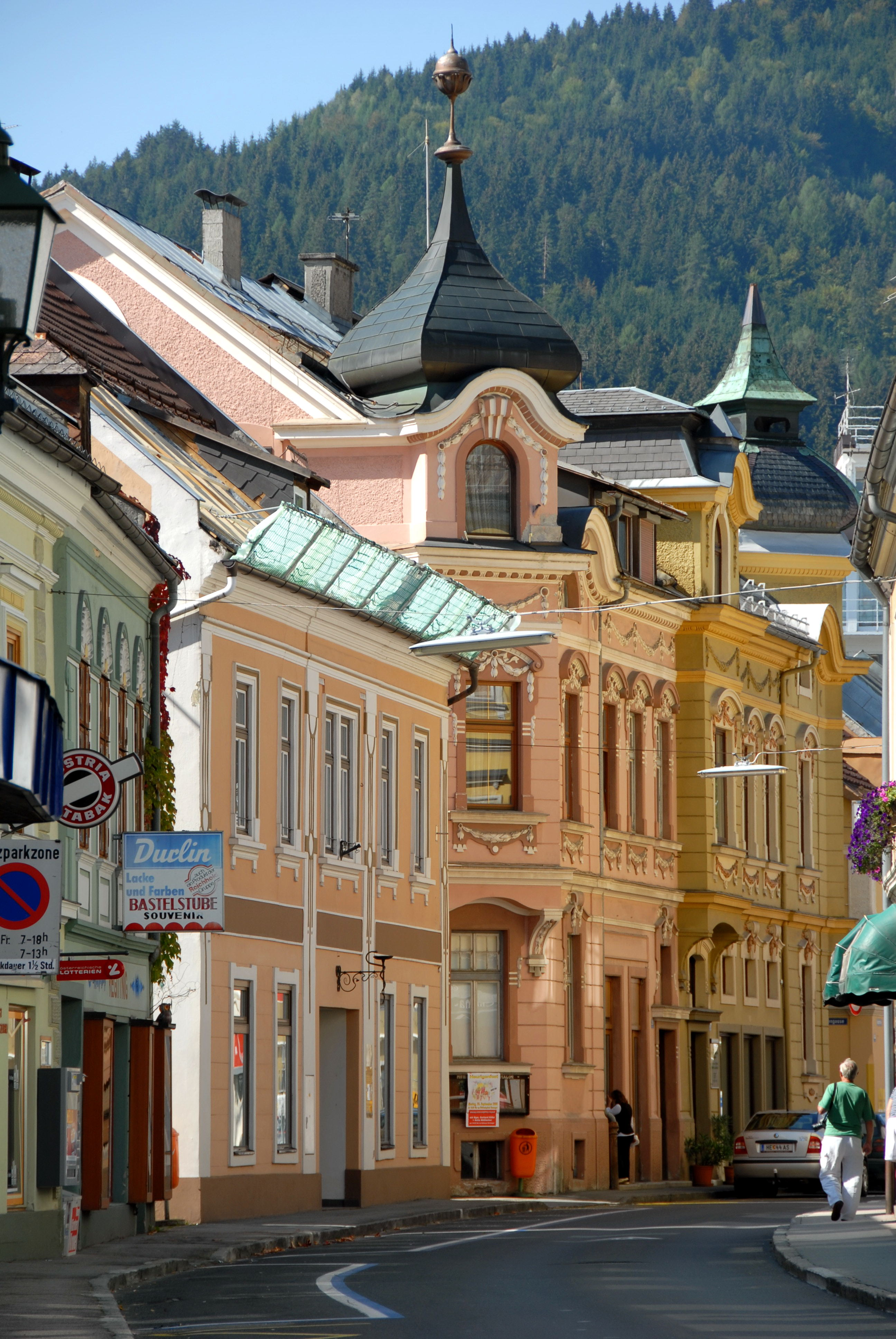
- Town centre

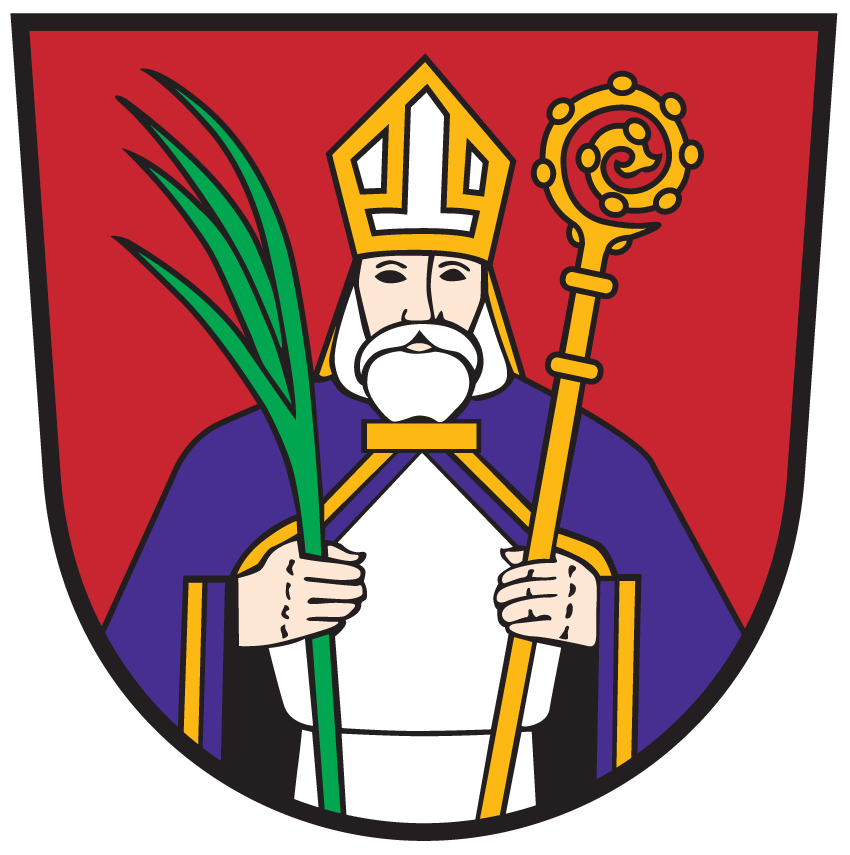
- Coat of arms

- Location within Austria Hermagor-Pressegger See (Kärnten)
- Coordinates: 46°37′38″N 13°22′02″E
- Country: Austria
- State: Carinthia
- District: Hermagor

Government
  - Mayor: Leopold Astner (ÖVP) (ÖVP)

Area
  - Total: 204.82 km^{2} (79.08 sq mi)
- Elevation: 602 m (1,975 ft)

Population (2018-01-01)
  - Total: 6,824
  - Density: 33.32/km^{2} (86.29/sq mi)
- Time zone: UTC+1 (CET)
  - Summer (DST): UTC+2 (CEST)
- Postal code: 9620
- Area code: 0 42 82
- Vehicle registration: HE
- Website: www.hermagor.at

Hermagor-Pressegger See (Slovene: Šmohor-Preseško jezero) is a town in the Austrian state of Carinthia. It is the administrative centre of the Hermagor District. The town is named after Saint Hermagoras of Aquileia, the first bishop of Aquileia.

== Geography ==
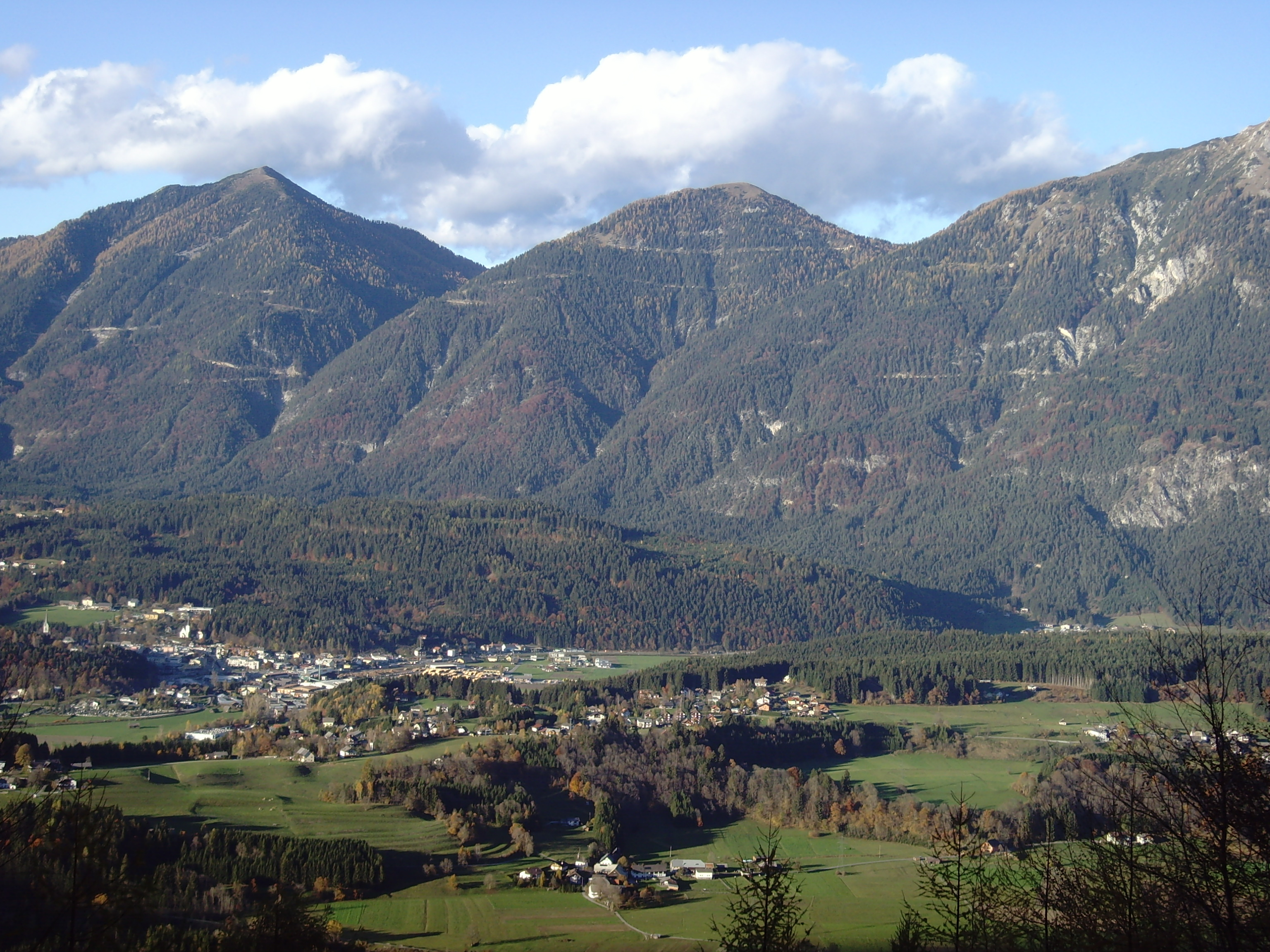
Hermagor in the Gail valley, view towards the Gailtal Alps

=== Location ===
Hermagor is located in the lower Gail valley at the northern foot of the Carnic Alps, close to the border with Italy. In the south, the Naßfeld Pass connects it with the Italian municipality of Pontebba. In the north, the road leads via Gitschtal into the Gailtal Alps, across Kreuzberg Saddle to the Weissensee lake and further down to Greifenburg in the Drava valley. Hermagor station is last train station on the Gailtal Railway line from Arnoldstein to Hermagor. Public transport between Hermagor and Kötschach-Mauthen has been discontinued.

The municipal area comprises shallow Pressegger See, one of the warmest lakes in Austria with extensive reed banks.

=== Municipal arrangement ===
Hermagor-Pressegger See is divided into the following cadastral communities:

- Tröpolach (Slovene: Drobolje or Dobropolje)
- Egg (Brdo)
- Görtschach (Goriče)
- Guggenberg
- Hermagor (Šmohor, earlier also Trg)
- Khünburg (Kimburg)
- Mitschig (Mičiče or Semičiče)
- Möderndorf (Modra vas)
- Möschach
- Nampolach (Napole)
- Rattendorf (Radnja vas)
- Watschig (Vačiče)
- Vellach (Bela)
- Neudorf (Genialovizo)

It is further divided into the following settlements: Achleiten (4), Aigen (4), Bergl (24), Braunitzen (12) (Boronica), Brugg (31) (Moste), Burgstall (9), Danz (26), Dellach (94) (Dole), Egg (178) (Brdo), Eggforst (10), Förolach (162), Fritzendorf (58) (Limarče), Görtschach (173), Götzing (22) (Gocina), Grafenau (0) (Kazla), Grünburg (70), Guggenberg (34), Hermagor (1.527) (Šmohor), Jenig (178) (Jenik), Kameritsch (80) (Kamerče), Khünburg (247), Kleinbergl (30), Kraß (14), Kraschach (57) (Krošani), Kreuth ob Möschach (19) (Rut(e)), Kreuth ob Mellweg (60) (Rut(e)), Kreuth ob Rattendorf (76) (Rute(e)), Kühweg (202), Kühwegboden (156), Latschach (86) (Loče), Liesch (7), Möderndorf (223) (Modrinja vas/ves), Mellach (49) (Mele), Mellweg (45) (Melviče, Maloviše), Micheldorf (167) (Velika vas/ves), Mitschig (79) (Mičiče), Nampolach (27) (Napole), Neudorf (271), Neuprießenegg (36), Obermöschach (38), Obervellach (243), Paßriach (143)(Pažirje), Podlanig (51) (Podlanig), Postran (123) (Postran), Potschach (61) (Potoče), Presseggen (222) (Preseka), Presseggersee (130) (Preseško jezero), Radnig (203), Radnigforst (0), Rattendorf (343) (Radnja vas), Schinzengraben (26), Schlanitzen (41) (Zelenica), Schmidt (1), Siebenbrünn (2), Sonnenalpe Naßfeld (27)(Mokrine), Sonnleitn (17), Süßenberg (20) (Planja), Toschehof (0) (Tesinje), Tröpolach (535) (Dobropolje, Dropolje), Untermöschach (48), Untervellach (229), Watschig (129) (Vočiče), Wittenig (50), Zuchen (3) (Suha).

== History ==
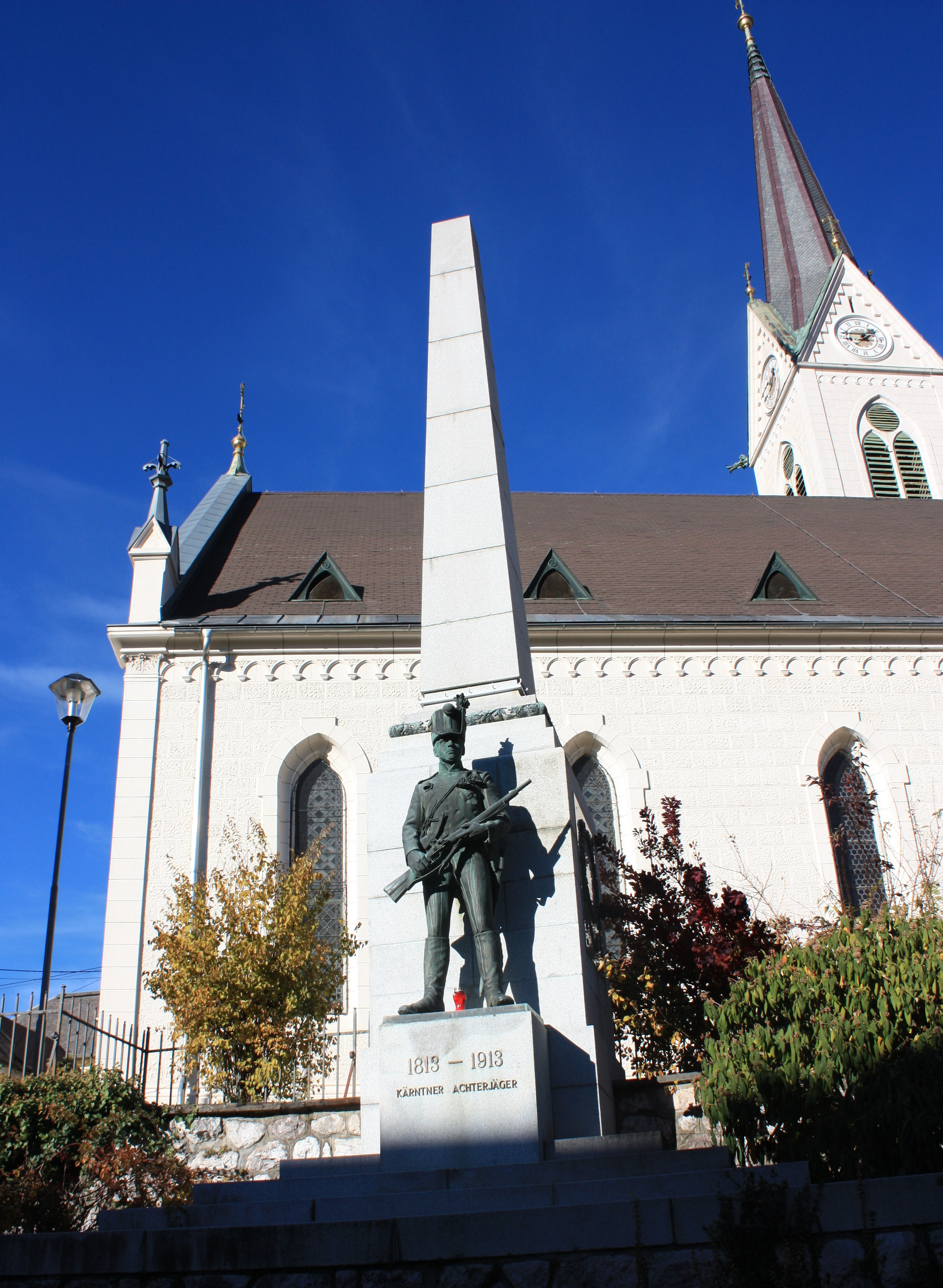
Saint Hermagoras parish church

Archaeological finds have shown that the historic iron ore mining area was already settled around 1800-1200 BC. It later was part of the Celtic kingdom of Noricum, which was incorporated into the Roman Empire in 15 BC.

The parish of Saint Hermagoras in the Duchy of Carinthia was first mentioned in an 1169 document, probably a foundation of the Patriarchs of Aquileia. Due to its strategic location, it quickly prospered, obtained market rights in 1288, and became the main settlement of the Gail valley.

In 1779 the botanist Franz Xaver von Wulfen discovered Wulfenia carinthiaca on the slopes of the Gartnerkofel peak. Hermagor became capital of the eponymous district in 1868 and was home of an Imperial-Royal Landwehr garrison. The Gailtal Railway line was built from 1894, it was extended in 1915 for military purposes on the Italian Front of World War I.

Hermagor obtained town privileges on 10 October 1930, on the occasion of the tenth anniversary of the Carinthian plebiscite. The present-day municipality of Hermagor-Pressegger See was established by a merger of several formerly independent communes in the course of a 1973 administrative reform.

== Demographics ==
Historical population
Year	Pop.	±%
1869	5,366	—
1880	5,821	+8.5%
1890	5,797	−0.4%
1900	6,030	+4.0%
1910	6,621	+9.8%
1923	6,095	−7.9%
1934	6,296	+3.3%
1939	6,760	+7.4%
1951	7,219	+6.8%
1961	7,036	−2.5%
1971	7,238	+2.9%
1981	7,079	−2.2%
1991	7,403	+4.6%
2001	7,232	−2.3%
2011	7,082	−2.1%
2021	6,960	−1.7%
2025	6,905	−0.8%

== Politics ==
The municipal council (Gemeinderat) consists of 27 members. Since the 2021 Carinthian local elections, it is made up of the following parties:

- Social Democratic Party of Austria (SPÖ): 12 seats
- Austrian People's Party (ÖVP): 9 seats
- List Karl Tillian - Social Citizen Movement Hermagor (TILL): 3 seats
- Freedom Party of Austria (FPÖ): 3 seats

The mayor of Hermagor-Pressegger See, Leopold Astner (ÖVP), was elected in 2021.

== Economy ==
The economy of Hermagor today largely depends on tourism, especially skiing around Nassfeld Pass, the largest ski area in Carinthia. Pressegger See and the surrounding mountains are also a traditional summer retreat and a popular destination for hikers.

== Points of interest ==
- Möderndorf Castle, including the Gail Valley Museum
- Garnitzenklamm, canyon with numerous waterfalls
- Egger Alm, seasonal mountain pasture with regional cheese production (Gailtaler Almkäse)
- Wurzer Dirndl, local production of alpine style traditional clothing (Dirndl), closed as of 2025

== Gallery ==
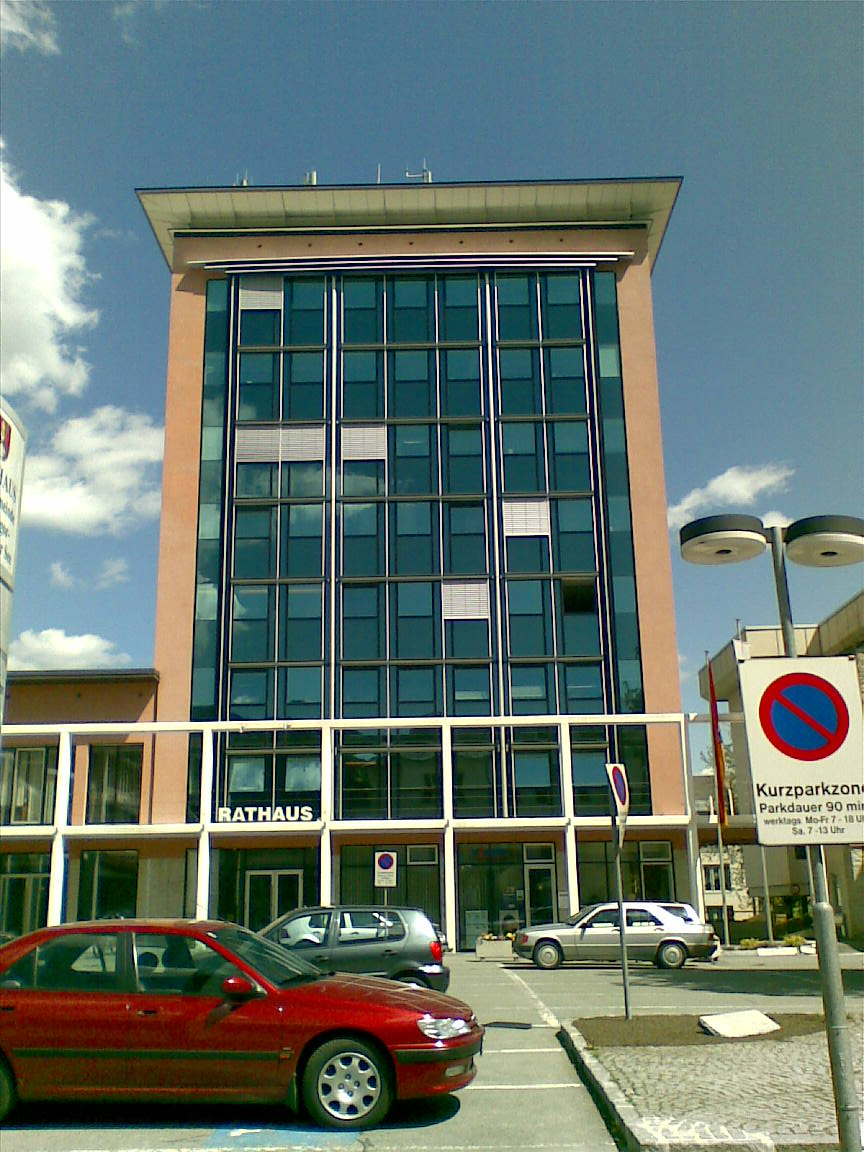
Town hall

== International relations ==
Hermagor is twinned with:

- Pontebba, Italy (since 1998)

== Notable people ==
- Matija Majar (1809–1892), Catholic priest and Carinthian Slovene political activist
- Roland Assinger (born 1973), skier
