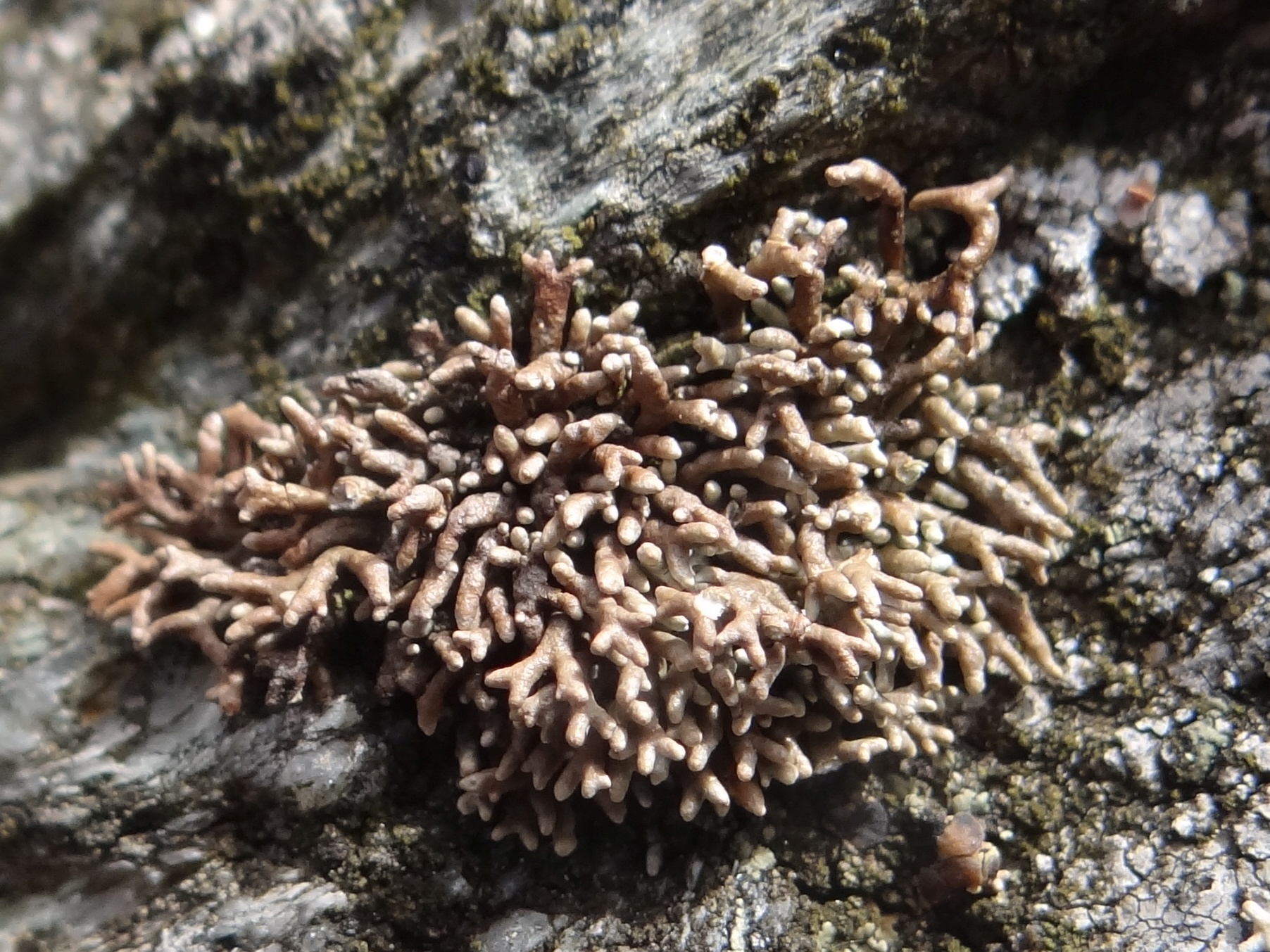

Scientific classification
- Kingdom: Fungi
- Division: Ascomycota
- Class: Lecanoromycetes
- Order: Lecanorales
- Family: Parmeliaceae
- Genus: Allocetraria
- Species: A. madreporiformis

Binomial name
- Allocetraria madreporiformis (Ach.) Kärnefelt & A.Thell (1996)

Synonyms
- List: Lichen madreporiformis Wulfen (1791); Dufourea madreporiformis Ach. (1810); Lichen squarrosus * madreporiformis (Ach.) Lam. (1813); Isidium madreporiforme (Ach.) Chevall. (1826); Parmelia madreporiformis (Ach.) Spreng. (1827); Siphula madreporiformis (Ach.) Duby (1830); Evernia madreporiformis (Ach.) Fr. (1831); Evernia fertilis subsp. madreporiformis (Ach.) Fr. (1831); Cetraria nivalis var. madreporiformis (Ach.) Schaer. (1850); Dactylina madreporiformis (Ach.) Tuck. (1862); Cetraria madreporiformis (Ach.) Müll.Arg. (1870); Evernia fertilis Fr. (1831); Dufoureomyces madreporiformis Cif. & Tomas. (1953)

= Allocetraria madreporiformis =

Species of lichen-forming fungus

Allocetraria madreporiformis, commonly known as V-fingers, is a species of fruticose lichen in the family Parmeliaceae. It forms a yellow-brown thallus of branching, somewhat inflated lobes that grow directly on the ground in arctic and high-mountain (alpine) habitats across the Northern Hemisphere. The species favours calcareous (lime-rich) soils in exposed, wind-swept sites such as ridges and arctic steppes, where wind erosion keeps mineral soil surfaces open. First described in 1810 by Erik Acharius and placed in Allocetraria in 1996, it contains usnic acid and protolichesterinic acid. Some populations are highly localised, including records from inner fjord districts of Svalbard and from glacier forefields (newly exposed ground in front of retreating glaciers) in the Austrian Alps; these occurrences have been discussed as possible results of long-distance dispersal from steppe-like areas (open, dry grass-dominated landscapes) in the Sino-Himalayan region, where Allocetraria has its highest diversity.

== Taxonomy ==
The species was first described by Erik Acharius in 1810 as Dufourea madreporiformis, from material collected on rocks in Carinthia and Switzerland (Helvetia), which he characterized as a pale whitish, tufted thallus with short, swollen, cylindrical branches with brownish tips and no apothecia observed in the specimens he examined. Acharius also cited "Lichen madreporiformis" of Wulfen (as published by Jacquin) as a possible earlier reference, but he marked the identification as uncertain and noted that specimens sent under that name by Schleicher did not match Jacquin's figure. The binomial name Lichen madreporiformis had already been published by William Withering in 1776, so Wulfen's later use of the same name in Jacquin is treated as an illegitimate later homonym. Accordingly, modern nomenclatural sources base the accepted name on Acharius's legitimate basionym Dufourea madreporiformis. It was later transferred to Dactylina by Edward Tuckerman (1862) and to Cetraria by Johannes Müller Argoviensis (1870). In current classifications, it is treated in Allocetraria. In 2001, Tiina Randlane and coauthors selected Acharius material from Switzerland (H-ACH 1507) as the lectotype (a later-chosen type specimen) to stabilize how the name is applied.

A named infraspecific taxon (a published variety/form within the species), originally published as Dufourea madreporiformis var. irregularis by Edvard August Vainio (1904) and later recombined as Dactylina madreporiformis f. irregularis by Bernt Arne Lynge (1933), has sometimes been described as having a strongly dorsiventral thallus (with a clearly distinct upper and lower side). Randlane and coauthors noted that this interpretation is not supported by Vainio's protologue (the original published description) or by the type material, which shows an inflated, largely radially symmetric thallus (similar on all sides) that may be only slightly compressed. They further suggested that North American reports based on specimens with distinctly flattened lobes are better referred to Allocetraria stracheyi rather than to A. madreporiformis.

Modern DNA-based studies support placing Allocetraria madreporiformis in the "cetrarioid core" group of Parmeliaceae, a group of mostly Northern Hemisphere lichens with an erect growth form ranging from foliose (leafy) to subfruticose (small, bushy, and upright). In a multi-locus phylogeny (using several DNA regions), including four commonly sequenced genetic markers (ITS, mtSSU, nuLSU and RPB1), the species was included and recovered within the cetrarioid core, supporting its placement in Allocetraria. The same study found that several cetrarioid genera are not each a single evolutionary lineage (a single branch of the family tree), so generic boundaries in the group remain an active area of revision.

== Description ==
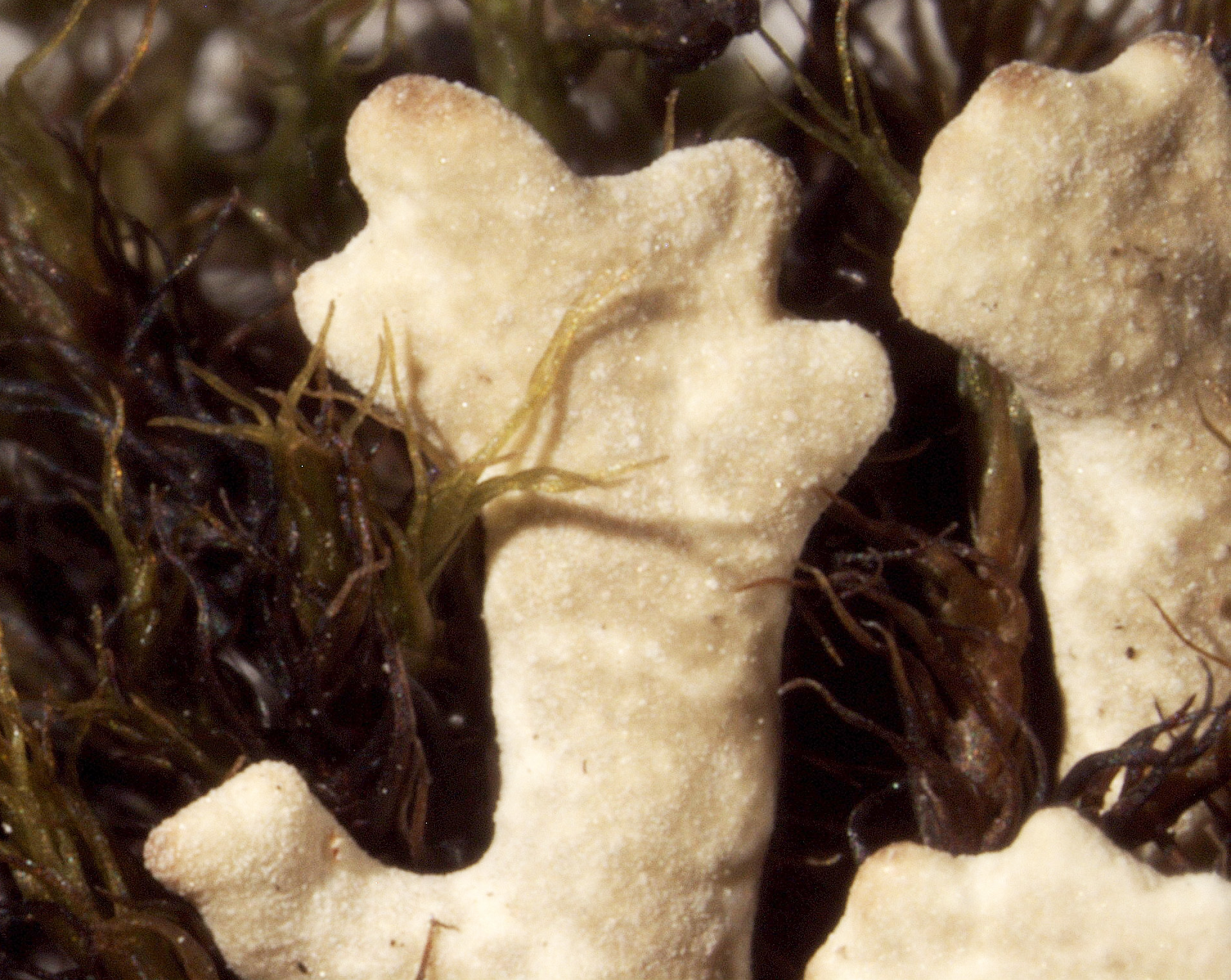
Detail of the pale yellow-brown, irregularly branching thallus with slightly inflated lobes

Allocetraria madreporiformis has a yellow-brown thallus composed of radially symmetric, slightly swollen branches; as a result, the lobes are more or less cylindrical rather than clearly differentiated into an upper and lower surface. An English vernacular name for the lichen, "V-fingers", refers to the repeatedly dichotomous, V-shaped branching that gives the thallus its finger-like appearance. These lobes grow to 3 cm tall and are 1–2 mm wide. Towards the centre of older thalli, the interior often becomes loose and web-like; the medulla (inner tissue) is white.

The species forms pycnidia (minute asexual fruiting bodies that produce spores) that are usually sunken in the thallus surface, though they may be slightly raised. Chemically, it contains usnic acid in the cortex (outer layer) and fatty acids of the lichesterinic–protolichesterinic type in the medulla. Chemical testing by thin-layer chromatography of ten specimens detected usnic acid and protolichesterinic acid as major compounds, with lichesterinic acid in minor amounts; two analysed specimens (one from Canada and one from Svalbard) also showed trace gyrophoric acid and other minor, unidentified lichen substances.

== Habitat and distribution ==
Allocetraria madreporiformis is a circumarctic (around the Arctic) and alpine (high-mountain) species, recorded from North America and Asia and also from the mountains of central Europe. In Asia it has been reported from China (including provinces such as Qinghai, Xinjiang, Xizang, and Yunnan), as well as from Kyrgyzstan, Mongolia, and Russia. On Svalbard, Allocetraria madreporiformis has a highly localized distribution, known from the inner fjord districts (inlets of the sea) of Wijdefjorden (including Austfjorden) in Spitsbergen. Surveys across the fjord system recorded it at 12 of 40 surveyed sites, with occurrences concentrated in the high-arctic steppe landscapes protected in Indre Wijdefjorden National Park; it was absent from adjacent middle-arctic tundra and from the most saline steppe areas.

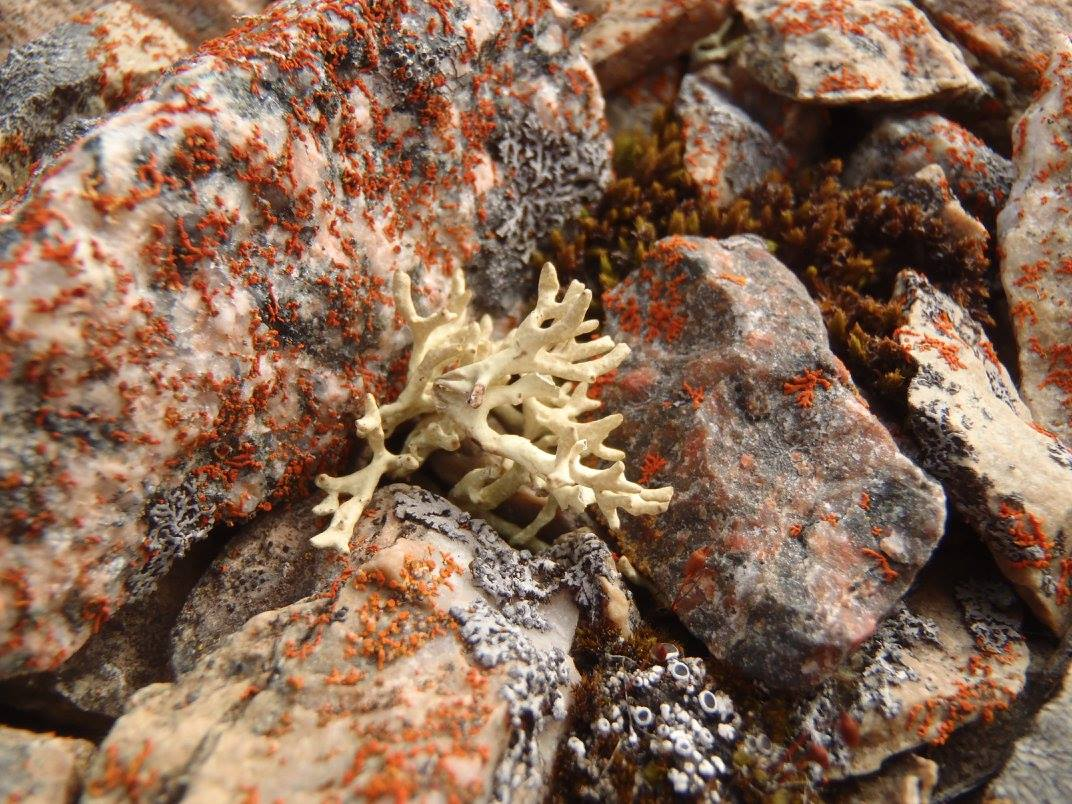
Growing amongst rock-dwelling lichens and mosses near the shore of Hope Bay, Nunavut, Canada

In this region it grows directly on soil (a terricolous lichen) on dry, wind-exposed ridges of fine-textured mineral soil, where wind erosion and aeolian (wind-blown) transport of silt and sand keep the surface unstable and the cryptogamic cover (lichens, mosses, and similar organisms) sparse. Soil sampling indicated that occurrences are concentrated on moderately alkaline substrates (about pH 7.0–8.5, with the highest frequencies around pH 7.8) and that the lichen largely avoids saline crusts and other extremely alkaline surfaces. In these open steppe habitats, otherwise common arctic-alpine fruticose ridge lichens are rare or absent where A. madreporiformis occurs. Because the genus Allocetraria is most diverse in the Sino-Himalayan region, Arve Elvebakk and coauthors suggested that the ecologically isolated Svalbard population may reflect long-distance dispersal from steppe-like habitats in the northern Qinghai–Tibetan Plateau, followed by establishment in the early Holocene (after the last glaciation).

Allocetraria madreporiformis was recorded as new to the Balkan Peninsula in 2022 after being found in the mountains of North Macedonia. In the Eastern Alps, the species has been recorded from the glacier forefield of the Pasterze Glacier (Hohe Tauern, Carinthia, Austria), where it grows on soil in the moraine (deposits of rock and soil left by a glacier). In a 2013 survey of terricolous lichens along a gradient of moraine age (from newly exposed deposits near the ice to older deposits farther away), it was absent from the youngest plots nearest the glacier front but present at sites farther from the ice, and was discussed among taxa whose occurrence reflects the influence of calcareous, base-rich substrate. In the Austrian Alps, surveys of small vegetation plots recorded A. madreporiformis in a wind-exposed microcommunity classified as Thamnolietum vermicularis. In that classification it is associated with the calcareous-soil form of the community (the subassociation vulpicidetosum tubulosi), and it was treated as a differential species (one used to distinguish that subassociation from related ones).

Abrothallus peyritschii is a lichenicolous (lichen-dwelling) fungus that has been recorded parasitizing A. madreporiformis in Mongolia.
