= Saag (surname) =

Saag or Saág is a surname. Notable people with the surname include:

- Andres Saag (born 1955), Estonian mycologist
- Gudbrand Gregersen de Saág (1824–1910), Hungarian engineer
- Harry Van Der Saag (born 1999), Australian soccer player
- Kaimar Saag (born 1988), Estonian footballer
- Lauri Saag (born 1977), Estonian geneticist
- Michael Saag (born 1955), American researcher

== See also ==
- SAAG (disambiguation)
