= Nephromopsis yunnanensis =

Scientific classification
- Domain: Eukaryota
- Kingdom: Fungi
- Division: Ascomycota
- Class: Lecanoromycetes
- Order: Lecanorales
- Family: Parmeliaceae
- Genus: Nephromopsis
- Species: N. yunnanensis

Binomial name
- Nephromopsis yunnanensis (Nyl.) Randlane & Saag, 1992

Species of fungus

Nephromopsis yunnanensis is a species of fungus belonging to the family Parmeliaceae.

Synonyms:

- Platysma yunnanensis Nyl., 1888 (basionym)
- Cetraria yunnanensis (Nyl.) Zahlbr., 1911
