= Nassfeld =

Town and ski resort in Austria

Coordinates: 46.5758°N 13.2619°E

- Interactive map of Nassfeld
- Location: Nassfeld, Carinthia, Austria
- Nearest city: Hermagor
- Top elevation: 2,000 meters (6,600 ft)
- Base elevation: 600 meters (2,000 ft)
- Skiable area: 110 Piste Kilometers
- Longest run: Carnia, 7.6 km
- Lift system: 30 total
- Terrain parks: 2, including 1 half pipe
- Website: www.nassfeld.at

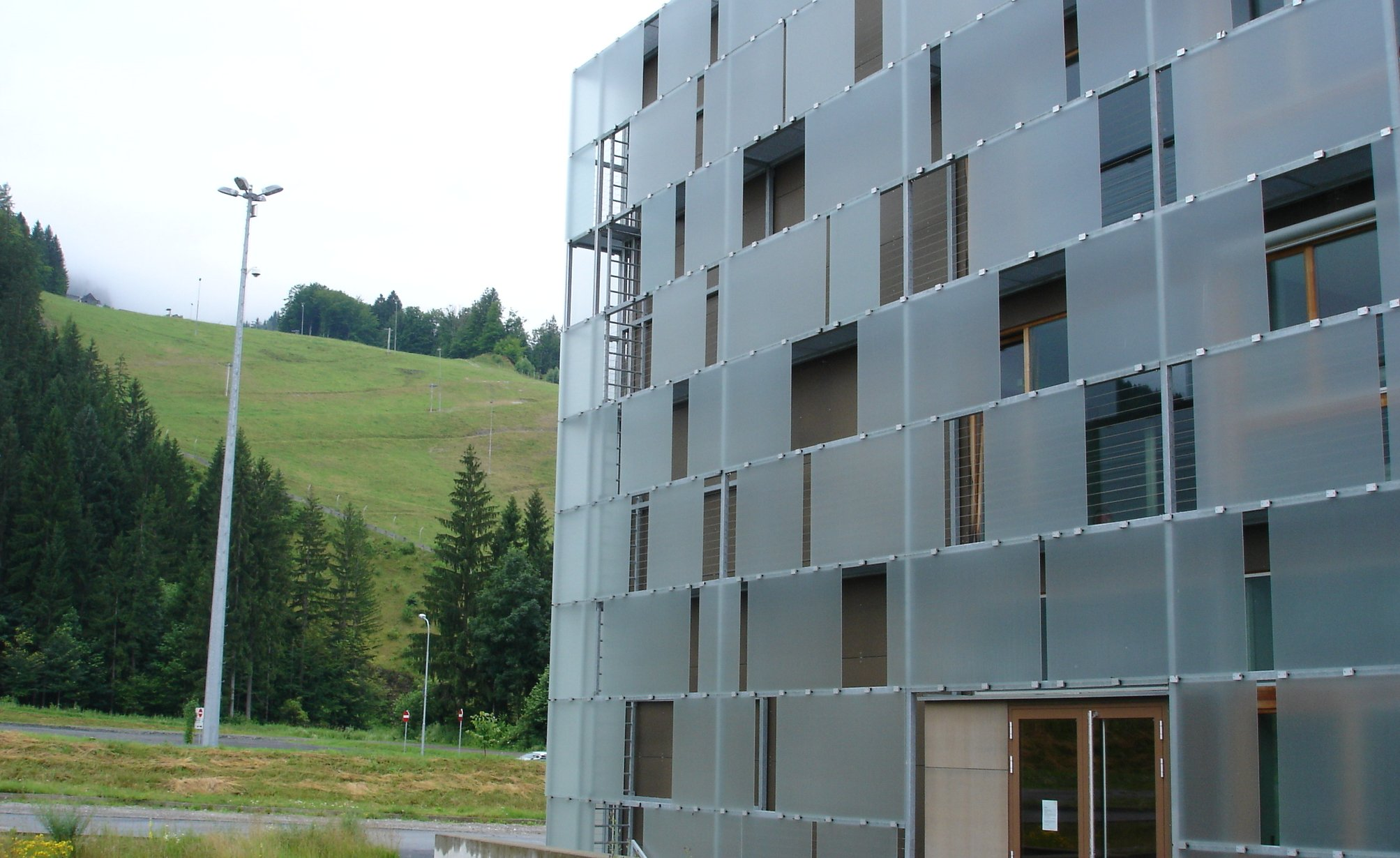
A view at the ski resort from Cube hotel in summer

Nassfeld or Naßfeld (Slovene: Mokrine, Italian: Passo di Pramollo) is a town and ski resort in the district Hermagor of the Austrian state of Carinthia.

It is located below the Nassfeld Pass. Lake Pressegg is nearby, where it is possible to swim in summer and ice skate in the winter.

== Ski resort ==
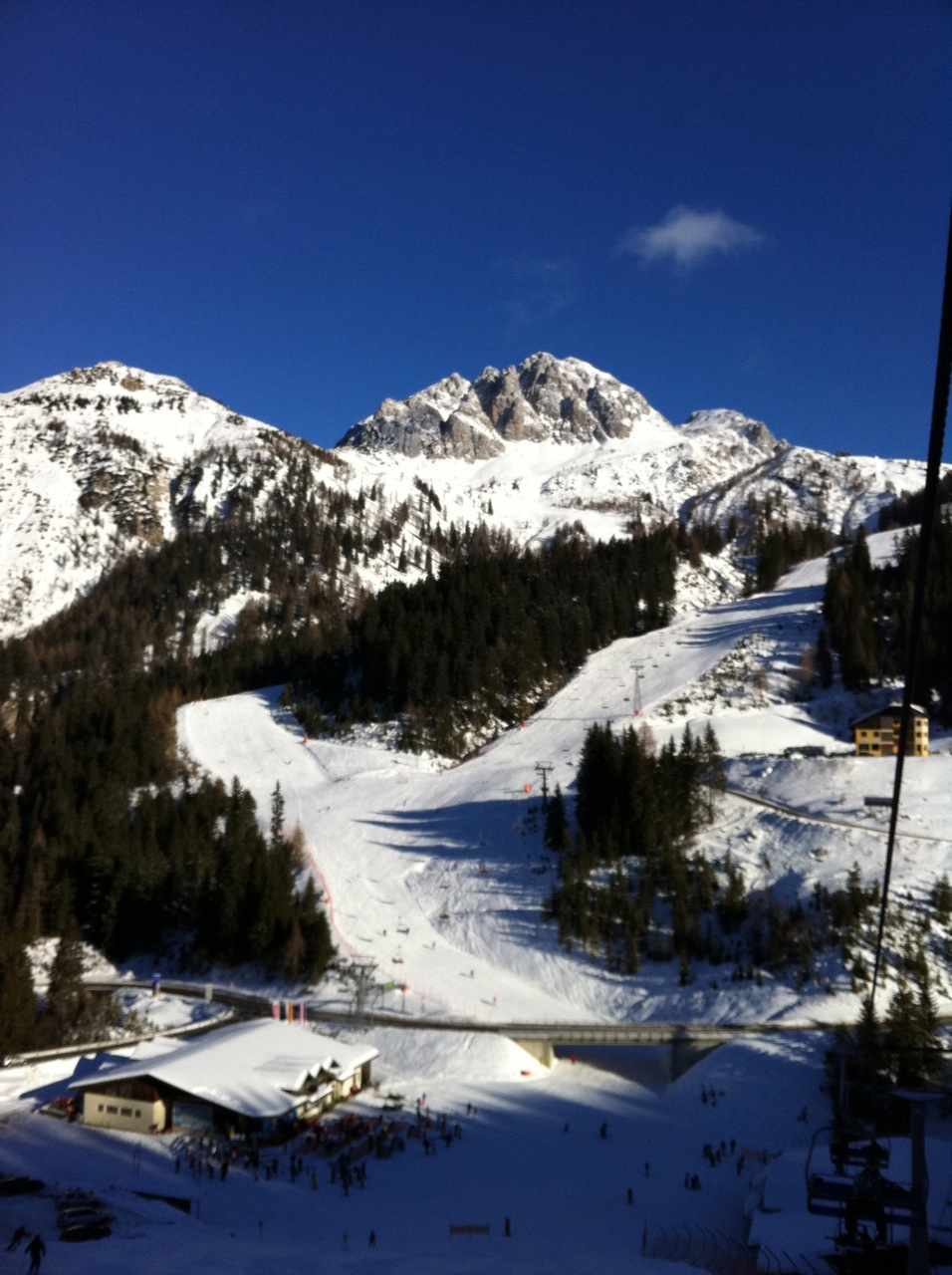
Nassfeld ski resort

Nassfeld is a popular sport destination for winter and summer sports which include skiing, snowboarding, cross-country skiing, mountain hiking and offers more than 1000 km of hiking trails. The area has 30 ski lifts: 5 Gondolas, 5 Six-Seater Chairlifts, 4 four-seater chairlifts and 16 tow lifts. The ski resort has over 220 snow machines for creating artificial snow and 110 km of ski tracks. The cable car called Millennium-Express can lift people to the summit 1919 meters high in less than 15 minutes. The ski resort expands on elevation between 600 and 2000 meters. It has one of Carinthia's longest runs, Carnia, with 7.6 Kilometers in length. weather often differs in these areas but its overall sunny in the summer months and quite a high temperature (5-15 degrees Celsius)
