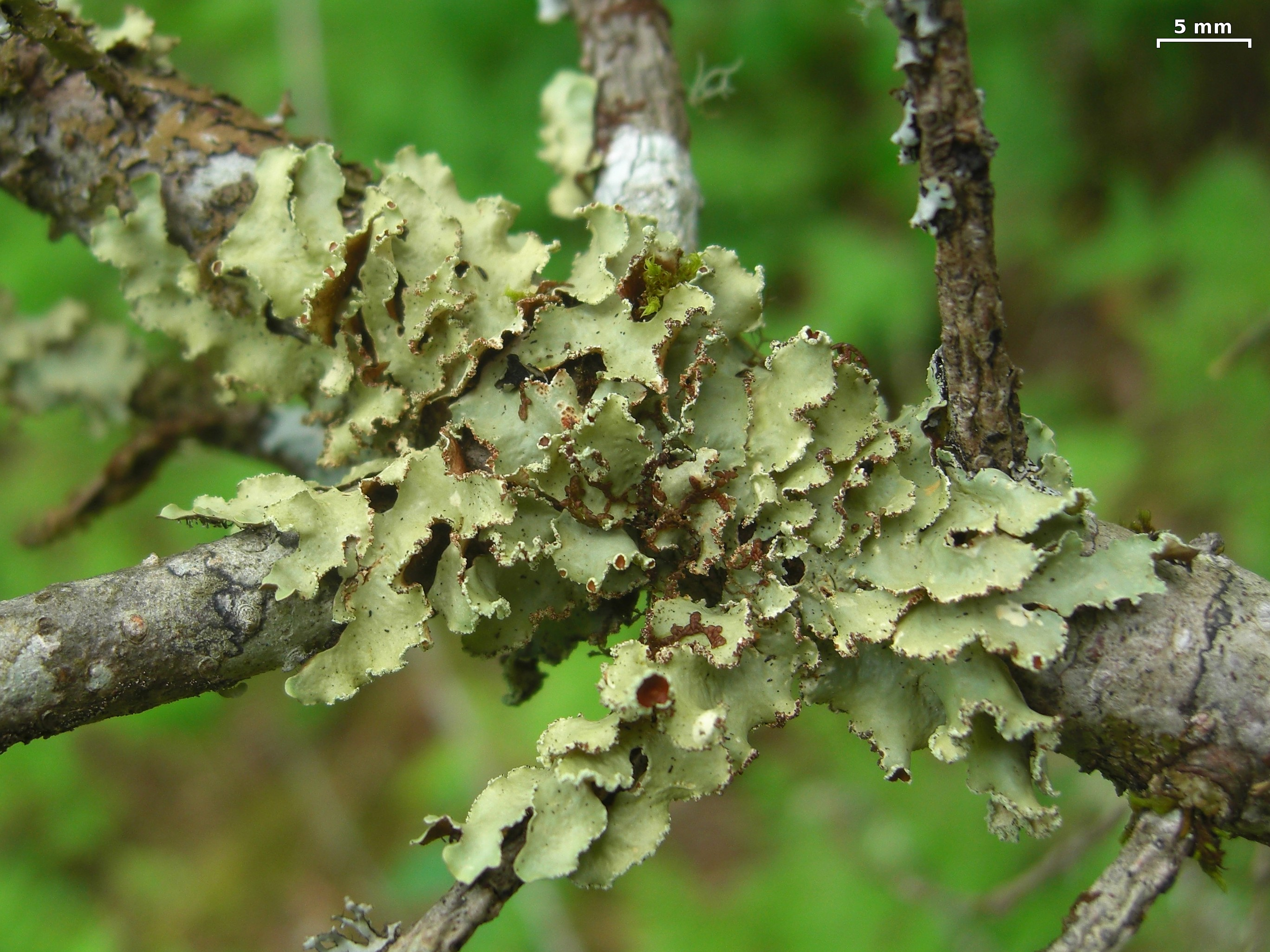
- Usnocetraria oakesiana

Scientific classification
- Domain: Eukaryota
- Kingdom: Fungi
- Division: Ascomycota
- Class: Lecanoromycetes
- Order: Lecanorales
- Family: Parmeliaceae
- Genus: Usnocetraria; M.J.Lai & J.C.Wei (2007)

Type species
- Usnocetraria oakesiana (Tuck.) M.J.Lai & J.C.Wei (2007)

Species
- U. kurokawae U. oakesiana

= Usnocetraria =

Genus of lichen

Usnocetraria is a small genus of lichen-forming fungi in the family Parmeliaceae. It contains two species of corticolous (bark-dwelling), foliose lichens.

== Taxonomy ==
The genus was circumscribed in 2007 by M.J.Lai and J.C.Wei as a segregate genus of Allocetraria, with Usnocetraria oakesiana selected as the type species. Although eleven species were proposed for transfer into the new genus, only two of them were validly published combinations (Usnocetraria oakesiana and U. kurokawae) because the others lacked basionym citations. A 2009 phylogenetic study suggested that the other proposed Usnocetraria species were not closely related to the type species, and recommended that the genus should be monotypic for U. oakesiana.

Usnocetraria is a member of the large lichen family Parmeliaceae. In 2017, Divakar and colleagues used a then-recently developed "temporal phylogenetic" approach to identify temporal bands for specific taxonomic ranks in the family Parmeliaceae, suggesting that groups of species that diverged within the time window of 29.45–32.55 million years ago represent genera. They proposed to synonymize Usnocetraria with Cetraria, because the former group of species originated relatively recently and fell under the timeframe threshold for genus level. This synonymy was not accepted in a later analysis.

== Description ==
Usnocetraria is a genus of lichens characterized by a leafy (foliose) and prostrate growth form. The thallus (lichen body) is composed of narrow, long lobes that can be either branched or simple. These lobes are clearly dorsiventral, meaning they have distinct upper and lower surfaces. Occasionally, the margins of the lobes may have soredia, which are powdery clusters of algal cells used for reproduction, and pseudocyphellae, which are small pores that facilitate gas exchange. These pseudocyphellae are primarily found on the underside of the thallus, though they can sometimes appear on both surfaces or be absent altogether.

The lower surface of the thallus may have sparse rhizines, which are root-like structures that anchor the lichen to its substrate, or these rhizines may be absent. The cortex, or outer layer, of the thallus is somewhat prosoplectenchymatous, indicating a particular type of tissue structure. The medulla, the inner layer of the thallus, can be white or yellowish.

Apothecia, the fruiting bodies where sexual spores are produced, are very rare in Usnocetraria. When present, they contain globose (spherical) or subglobose (nearly spherical) ascospores. Pycnidia, which are structures that produce asexual spores (pycnoconidia), are also uncommon but, when present, have filiform (thread-like) or slightly sublageniform (somewhat flask-shaped) pycnoconidia.

A characteristic chemical feature of Usnocetraria is the consistent presence of usnic acid in the cortex, which contributes to the lichen's defense mechanisms and colouration. Additionally, various fatty acids, such as caperatic and types associated with lichesterinic and protolichesterinic acids, along with secalonic acids and other related yellow pigments, may also be present in the medulla. Some species within the genus also contain fumarprotocetraric and protocetraric acids, adding to the diversity of chemical compounds found in these lichens.

== Species ==
As of June 2024, Species Fungorum accepts two species of Usnocetraria:

- Usnocetraria kurokawae (Shibuichi & K.Yoshida) M.J.Lai & J.C.Wei (2007)
- Usnocetraria oakesiana (Tuck.) M.J.Lai & J.C.Wei (2007)

The following new combinations, all proposed by Lai and Wei, have been rejected as not validly published:

- Usnocetraria denticulata (Hue) M.J.Lai & J.C.Wei (2007)
- Usnocetraria globulans (Nyl.) M.J.Lai & J.C.Wei (2007)
- Usnocetraria potaninii (Oxner) M.J.Lai & J.C.Wei (2007)
- Usnocetraria weii (X.Q.Gao & L.H.Chen) M.J.Lai & J.C.Wei (2007)
- Usnocetraria xizangensis (J.C.Wei & Y.M.Jiang) M.J.Lai & J.C.Wei (2007)

== Distribution ==
The type species, Usnocetraria oakesiana, has a wide distribution, having been recorded from Europe, Asia, and North America. Usnocetraria kurokawae is a rare lichen species that is endemic to Japan. It was lectotypified in 2013.
