= Sag =

SAG, SAg or sag may refer to:

== Land formations ==
- Sag (geology), or trough, a depressed, persistent, low area
- Sag pond, a body of water collected in the lowest parts of a depression

== People ==
- Ivan Sag (1949–2013), American linguist

== Places ==
- Šag, a village near Osijek in Croatia
- Sâg, a commune located in Sălaj County, Romania
- Șag, a commune in Timiș County, Romania
- Sag Harbor, New York, a village in Suffolk County, New York, USA
- The Sag, a colloquialism for the Sagtikos State Parkway on Long Island, New York
- Sag, a barangay in Talibon, Bohol, Philippines

== Science ==
- Short for Sagittarius, a zodiac sign
- SAg, short for superantigen
- SAG (gene), encodes the protein S-Arrestin in humans
- Sagitta (optics), a measure of lens surface shape
- Smoothened agonist, a small bioactive molecule
- Lens sag, distortion of astronomical lenses and mirrors
- Voltage sag or voltage dip, brief drop in voltage
- SAG or single amplified genome, used to describe genomes recovered from a single cell

== Organizations ==
- SAG-AFTRA (Screen Actors Guild‐American Federation of Television and Radio Artists), an American labor union
  - Screen Actors Guild, a former American labor union merged into SAG-AFTRA
- Scientific Advisory Group, United States Air Force
- Scientific Analysis Group, a laboratory of the Defence Research and Development Organization of India
- SQL Access Group, was a group of software companies
- Surface Action Group, a group of combat ships
- Senior Advisory Group, advisory group to Australian government on the Indigenous voice to government
- Service aérien gouvernemental, a Quebec government agency managing the provincial government's aircraft fleet

== Other uses ==
- SG&A, an alternative representation of Selling, General and Administrative Expenses
- SAG mill, semi-autogenous grinding mill
- SAG wagon or broom wagon, a support vehicle following a group of cyclists or people who ride bikes
- Sango language of Central African Republic (or Sangho'), ISO 639-2 and -3 code
- Screen Actors Guild Awards (also known as the SAG Awards)

== See also ==
- Saag, a South Asian vegetable dish
- SAAG (disambiguation)
- Sagging (disambiguation)
