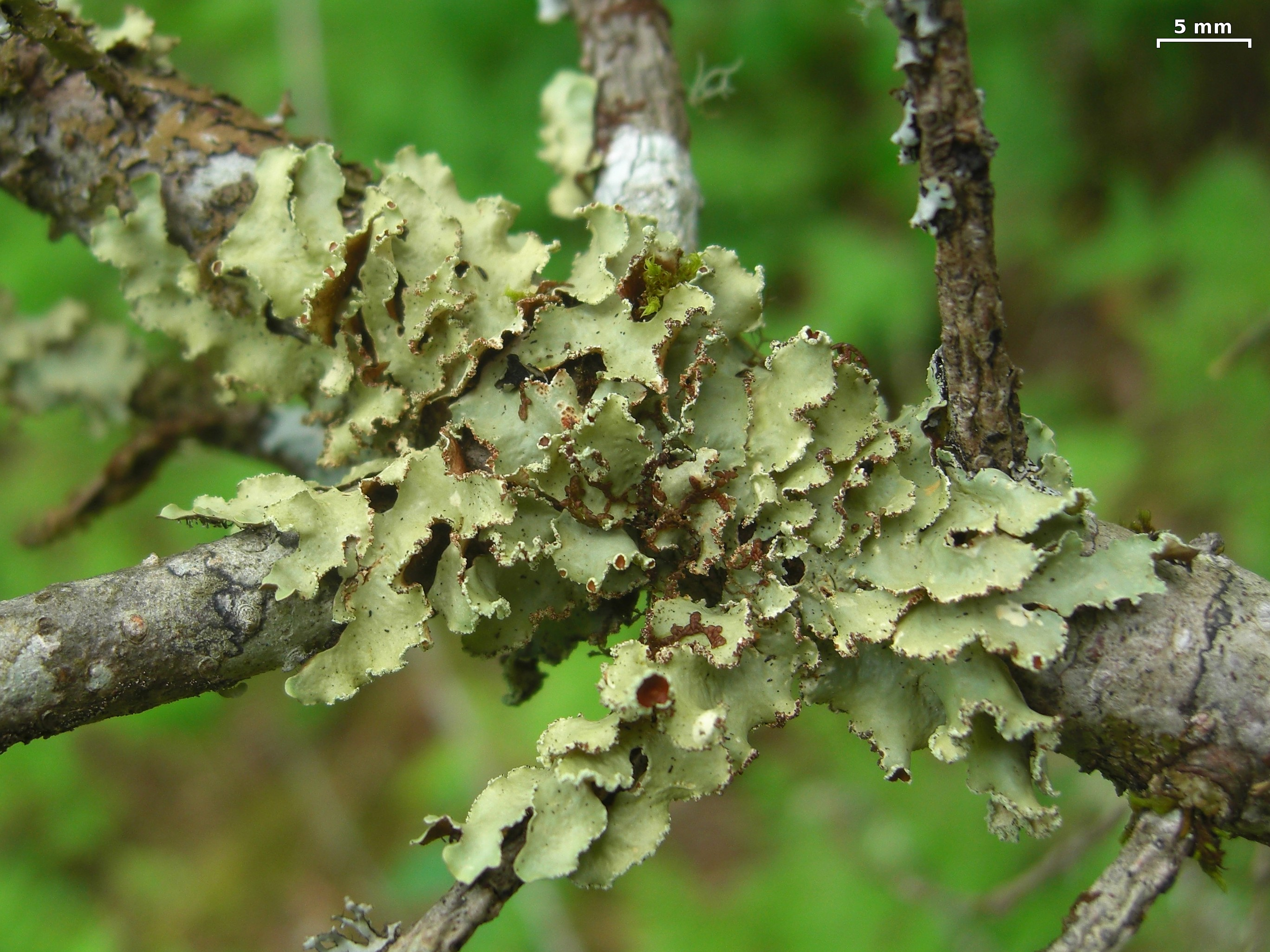
- in North Carolina, USA

Conservation status
- Secure (NatureServe)

Scientific classification
- Kingdom: Fungi
- Division: Ascomycota
- Class: Lecanoromycetes
- Order: Lecanorales
- Family: Parmeliaceae
- Genus: Usnocetraria
- Species: U. oakesiana

Binomial name
- Usnocetraria oakesiana (Tuck.) M.J.Lai & J.C.Wei (2007)

Synonyms
- List: Cetraria oakesiana Tuck. (1841); Platysma oakesianum (Tuck.) Nyl. (1855); Platisma oakesianum (Tuck.) A.Massal. (1856); Platysma complicatum subsp. oakesianum (Tuck.) Nyl. (1860); Tuckermannopsis oakesiana (Tuck.) Hale (1987); Allocetraria oakesiana (Tuck.) Randlane & A.Thell (1995)

= Usnocetraria oakesiana =

Species of lichen-forming fungus

Usnocetraria oakesiana, commonly known as the yellow ribbon lichen, or the yellow-green ribbon lichen, is a species of corticolous (bark-dwelling), foliose lichen in the family Parmeliaceae. It occurs in Asia, Europe, the north-eastern United States, and eastern Canada.

== Taxonomy ==
The species was first scientifically described in 1851 by the American lichenologist Edward Tuckerman, who classified it in the genus Cetraria. His diagnosis of the species was as follows: "Cetraria oakesiana is characterized by a somewhat leathery, expanded thallus that is smooth and greenish-yellow on the upper surface, and pale chestnut-brown underneath. The lobes are flat, ascending, with elevated margins that are fringed with black cilia and eventually become powdery. The apothecia are reddish-brown with an entire (smooth and unbroken) margin. It resembles Cetraria virescens." Tuckerman dedicated species epithet to his friend, the American botanist William Oakes of Ipswich, Massachusetts. Mason Hale proposed to transfer it to the genus Tuckermannopsis in 1987. Tiina Randlane and Arne Thell reclassified it in Allocetraria in 1995. Ming-Jou Lai and Jiang-Chun Wei transferred it to Usnocetraria, a segregate genus of Allocetraria that they circumscribed in 2007.

== Description ==
Usnocetraria oakesiana is a foliose lichen, meaning it has a leafy appearance with a structure that is dorsiventral, indicating that the upper and lower surfaces are distinctly different. The thallus is closely attached to its substrate, forming irregular patches. The lobes of the lichen are elongated and typically measure 4 to 10 mm (0.16 to 0.39 in) in width. They are usually concave with their edges raised, and these edges are covered with soredia—powdery propagules of algae and fungal cells. The upper surface of the lichen is yellowish-green, smooth, and somewhat glossy, while the lower surface is tan to pale brown. The lower surface also features scattered rhizines, which are root-like structures that help anchor the lichen to its substrate. These rhizines are simple or forked, pale brown in color, and there are no pseudocyphellae—tiny pores that some lichens have on their surface.

Both the upper and lower cortices, or outer layers, of the lichen are paraplectenchymatous, which means they are made of tightly packed cells with thick walls, although these layers are relatively thin. The medulla, or inner layer, is white.

Apothecia, the fruiting bodies where spores are produced, are extremely rare in this species. When present, they are zeorine (a type of apothecium with both thalline and proper margins), usually located near the edges of the lobes, and can be up to 7 mm across with a pale brown disc. The asci (spore-bearing structures within the apothecia) are clavate (club-shaped) and typically contain eight spores. The ascospores are one-celled, hyaline (transparent), and nearly spherical, about 5 μm in diameter.

Pycnidia, which are small, flask-shaped structures that produce asexual spores, are also rare in this species. They are black, located at the edges of the lobes, and slightly protrude from the surface. The conidia (asexual spores) produced by the pycnidia are sublageniform, meaning they are somewhat flask-shaped, and measure 7–12 μm in length and 0.8–2 μm in width.

Usnocetraria oakesiana has a chlorococcoid photobiont, meaning that its symbiotic algal partner belongs to a group of green algae with small, round cells. The lichen does not react to standard chemical spot tests (K−, C−, KC−, P−), but its upper cortex contains usnic acid, a compound often responsible for the yellowish color, while the medulla contains caperatic, lichesterinic, and protolichesterinic acids, which are secondary metabolites specific to certain lichens.

== Habitat and distribution ==
Usnocetraria oakesiana occurs in Asia, Europe, and North America. It grows on bark, on wood, and on rock, often preferring older, shaded forests. In Nepal, it has been reported from 3,900 to 4,200 m (12,800 to 13,800 ft) elevation in a compilation of published records.
