= Gartnerkofel =

Mountain of the Carnic Alps in Carinthia, Austria

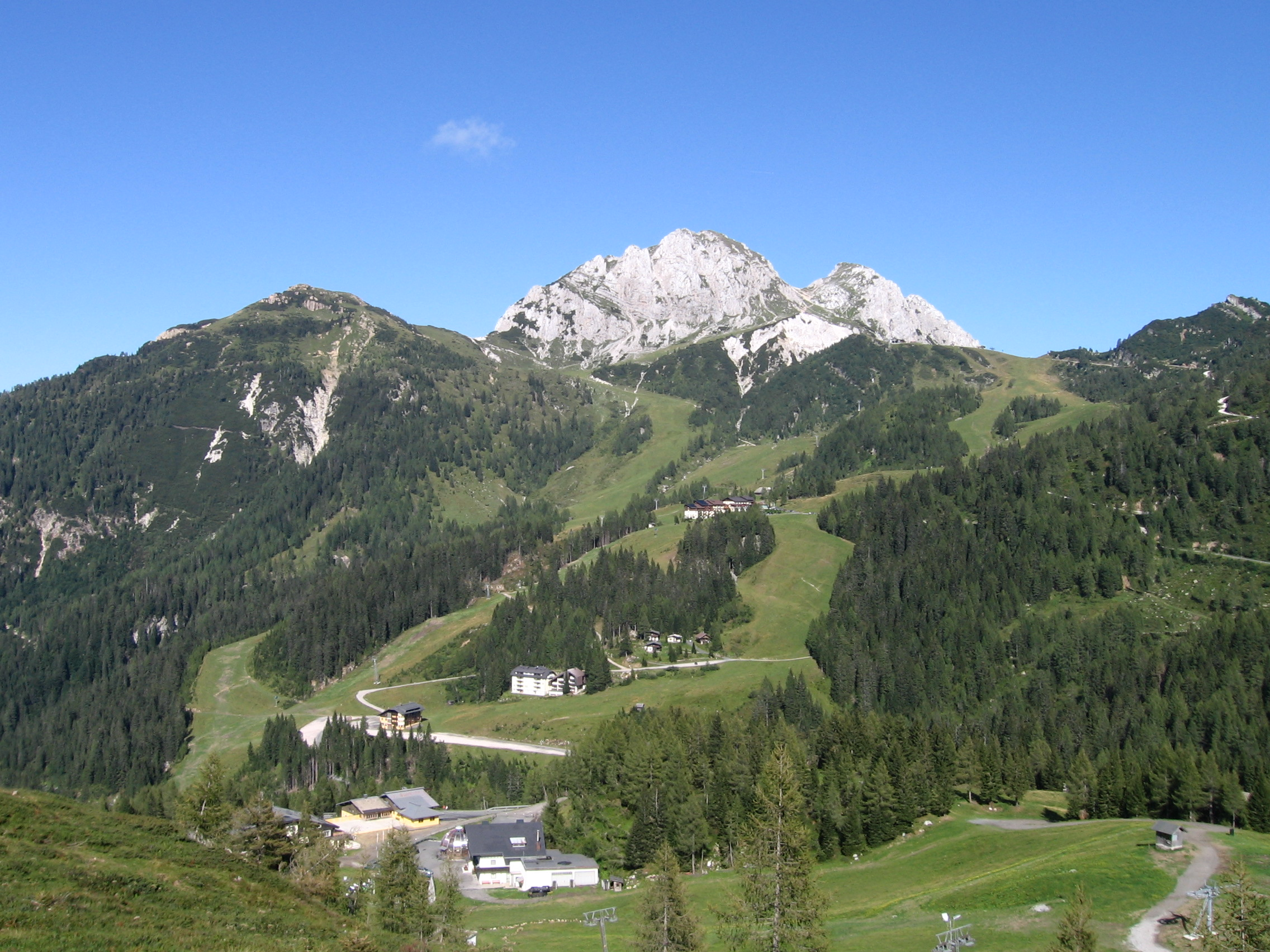
- Gartnerkofel

Highest point
- Elevation: 2,195 m (7,201 ft)
- Prominence: 665 m (2,182 ft)
- Coordinates: 46°34′N 13°18′E

Geography
- Location within Alps
- Location: Carinthia, Austria
- Parent range: Carnic Alps

Gartnerkofel (2,195 m) is a mountain of the Carnic Alps in Carinthia, Austria. It is located on the main chain of the Carnics above the Naßfeld Pass, near the border with Italy. The nearest town is Hermagor-Pressegger See. The mountain has two summits, and ravines fall down from its northern slopes, which are separated by rocky ridges. The normal route is from the northwest, from where it an easy climb across the ridge to the summit. The mountain is also a popular ski touring destination.

== Wulfenia carinthiaca ==
The slopes of Gartnerkofel are the only place where the endemic plant species Wulfenia carinthiaca (family: Plantaginaceae) is to be found growing in the wild. It was first discovered in 1799 by alpinist and botanist Franz Xaver von Wulfen and is now a popular garden plant, thanks to its attractive spikes of blue flowers.
