= Sagaing earthquake =

Sagaing earthquake may refer to:

- 1946 Sagaing earthquakes
- 1956 Sagaing earthquake
- 2025 Sagaing earthquake

== See also ==
- List of earthquakes in Myanmar
- Sagaing (disambiguation)
