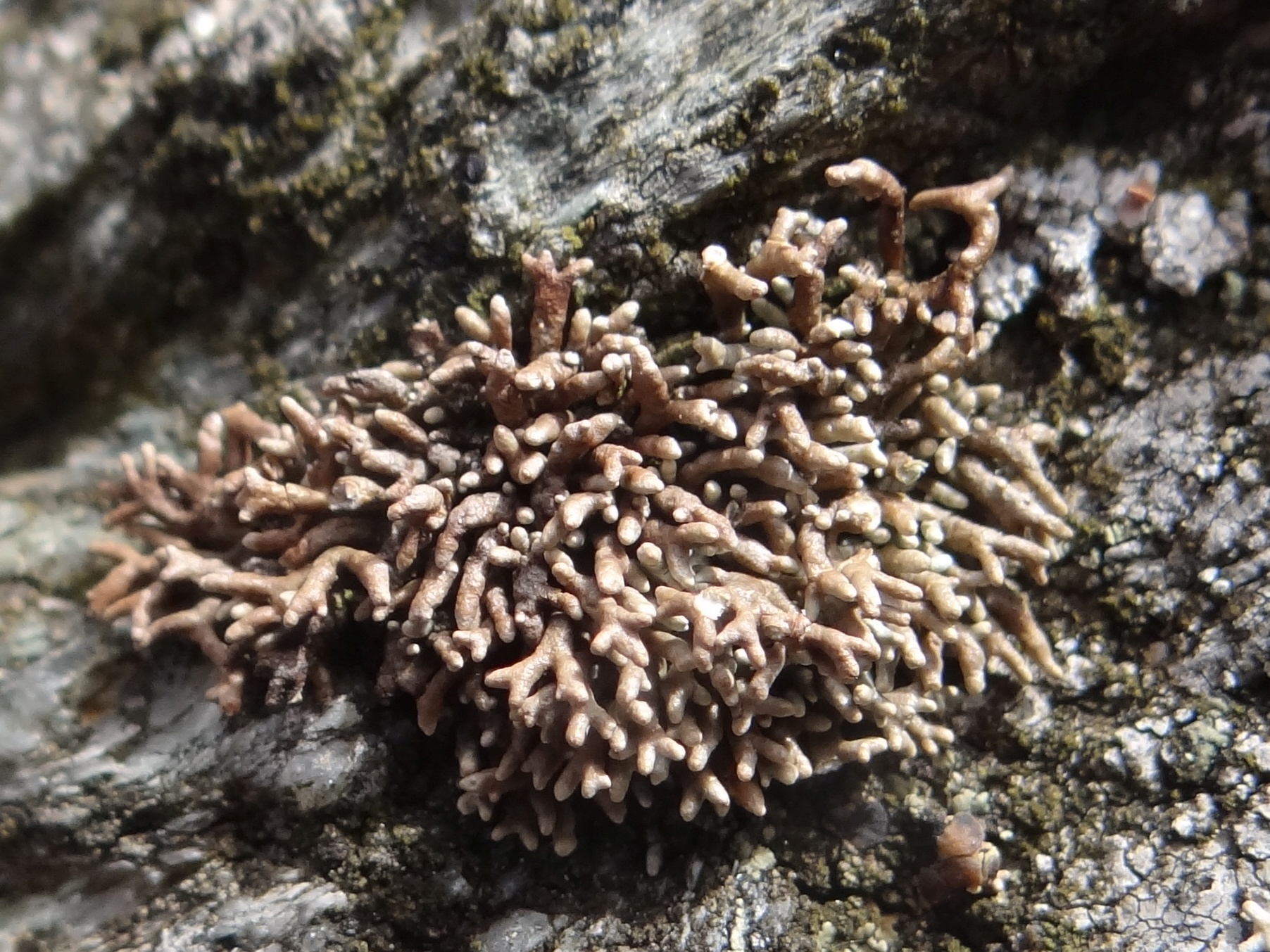
- Allocetraria madreporiformis

Scientific classification
- Kingdom: Fungi
- Division: Ascomycota
- Class: Lecanoromycetes
- Order: Lecanorales
- Family: Parmeliaceae
- Genus: Allocetraria; Kurok. & M.J.Lai (1991)

Type species
- Allocetraria stracheyi (Bab.) Kurok. & M.J.Lai (1991)

= Allocetraria =

Genus of lichens

Allocetraria is a genus of lichenized fungi in the family Parmeliaceae. It consists of 12 species, with a center of distribution in China.

== Systematics ==
The genus was circumscribed by Syo Kurokawa and Ming-Jou Lai in 1991, with three species: both A. ambigua and the type species A. stracheyi recombined from different genera, and a newly described species, A. isidiigera. Subsequent molecular phylogenetic analyses showed that Allocetraria forms a monophyletic group within the cetrarioid clade in the family Parmeliaceae.

In 2017, Divakar and colleagues used a then-recently developed "temporal phylogenetic" approach to identify temporal bands for specific taxonomic ranks in the family Parmeliaceae, suggesting that groups of species that diverged within the time window of 29.45–32.55 million years ago represent genera. They proposed to synonymize Allocetraria (and several other genera) with Cetraria, because the former group of species originated relatively recently and fell under the timeframe threshold for genus level. The net result of this proposal was to reduce 13 previously accepted genera in the cetrarioid clade down to two. This synonymy was not accepted in a later critical analysis of this technique for lichen systematics. Arve Elvebakk and colleagues expressed a similar opinion, stating that they would "prefer a model of 13 imperfectly defined cetrarioid core genera in addition to ‘orphaned’ species, over an alternative of only two widely defined ones, as a starting point for further phylogenetic studies".

== Description ==
Distinguishing features of the genus include a palisade plectenchymatous upper cortex, asci with a broad axial body, ascospores that are more or less spherical, and threadlike (filiform) pycnoconidia. Species in the genus produce the secondary chemical usnic acid, but never atranorin. Lichesterinic and protolichesterinic acids are found in most species.

== Habitat and distribution ==
The main area of distribution of Allocetraria is China, as nearly all the species occur there.

== Species ==
- Allocetraria ambigua (C.Bab.) Kurok. & M.J.Lai (1991) – China; India; Nepal
- Allocetraria capitata R.F.Wang, Li S.Wang & J.C.Wei (2014) – China
- Allocetraria corrugata R.F.Wang, X.L.Wei & J.C.Wei (2015) – China
- Allocetraria denticulata (Hue) A.Thell & Randlane (1995)
- Allocetraria endochrysea (Lynge) Kärnefelt & A.Thell (1996) – China
- Allocetraria flavonigrescens A.Thell & Randlane (1995) – China; Nepal
- Allocetraria globulans (Nyl.) A.Thell & Randlane (1995) – China; Nepal
- Allocetraria isidiigera Kurok. & M.J.Lai (1991) – China; Nepal
- Allocetraria madreporiformis (Ach.) Kärnefelt & A.Thell (1996) – China; Mongolia; Turkistan; North America; Europe
- Allocetraria sinensis X.Q.Gao (1995) – China; Nepal
- Allocetraria stracheyi (C.Bab.) Kurok. & M.J.Lai (1991) – China; India; Nepal; North America
- Allocetraria yunnanensis R.F.Wang, X.L.Wei & J.C.Wei (2015) – China

Former Allocetraria species:

- Allocetraria cucullata (Bellardi) Randlane & Saag (1992) (now Flavocetraria cucullata)
- Allocetraria nivalis (L.) Randlane & Saag (1992) (now Flavocetraria nivalis)
- Allocetraria oakesiana (Tuck.) Randlane & A.Thell (1995) (now Usnocetraria oakesiana)
- Allocetraria potaninii (Oxner) Randlane & Saag (1992) was synonymized with Allocetraria stracheyi in 1995.
