= Smoothened =

Gene found in humans and other animals

SMO

Identifiers
- Aliases: SMO, FZD11, Gx, SMOH, smoothened, frizzled class receptor, CRJS, PHLS
- External IDs: OMIM: 601500; MGI: 108075; GeneCards: SMO
Available structures
PDB	Ortholog search: PDBe RCSB
PDB	List of PDB id codes 4JKV, 4N4W, 4O9R, 4QIM, 4QIN, 5L7I

Gene location (Human)
Chr.	Chromosome 7 (human)
Band	7q32.1	Start	129,188,633 bp
Band	7q32.1	End	129,213,545 bp

Gene location (Mouse)
Chr.	Chromosome 6 (mouse)
Band	6 A3.3|6 12.36 cM	Start	29,735,502 bp
Band	6 A3.3|6 12.36 cM	End	29,761,364 bp
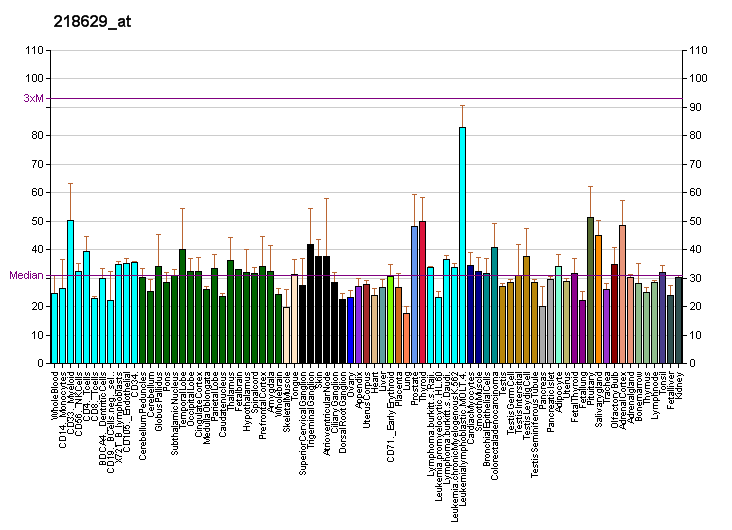
RNA expression pattern
Bgee	Human / Mouse (ortholog); Top expressed in: ventricular zone; left ovary; right ovary; ganglionic eminence; canal of the cervix; pancreatic ductal cell; ectocervix; body of uterus; anterior pituitary; right lobe of liver / Top expressed in: genital tubercle; ventricular zone; tail of embryo; lip; right kidney; esophagus; embryo; embryo; yolk sac; dentate gyrus of hippocampal formation granule cell; More reference expression data
BioGPS	More reference expression data
Gene ontology
Molecular function	patched binding; protein binding; transmembrane signaling receptor activity; signal transducer activity; G protein-coupled receptor activity; Wnt-protein binding; Wnt-activated receptor activity
Cellular component	cytoplasm; endocytic vesicle membrane; membrane; caveola; cell projection; extracellular exosome; Golgi apparatus; intracellular membrane-bounded organelle; plasma membrane; ciliary tip; ciliary membrane; cilium; integral component of membrane
Biological process	pattern specification process; pancreas morphogenesis; negative regulation of DNA binding; smoothened signaling pathway involved in ventral spinal cord patterning; vasculogenesis; heart looping; odontogenesis of dentin-containing tooth; atrial septum morphogenesis; cell surface receptor signaling pathway; positive regulation of mesenchymal cell proliferation; cerebellar cortex morphogenesis; positive regulation of multicellular organism growth; hair follicle morphogenesis; regulation of heart morphogenesis; type B pancreatic cell development; positive regulation of neuroblast proliferation; renal system development; positive regulation of branching involved in ureteric bud morphogenesis; positive regulation of smoothened signaling pathway; ossification; embryonic organ development; dentate gyrus development; epithelial-mesenchymal cell signaling; regulation of stem cell population maintenance; in utero embryonic development; cellular response to cholesterol; negative regulation of gene expression; positive regulation of transcription, DNA-templated; forebrain morphogenesis; negative regulation of hair follicle development; central nervous system development; central nervous system neuron differentiation; positive regulation of protein import into nucleus; smoothened signaling pathway; G protein-coupled receptor signaling pathway; multicellular organism growth; thalamus development; positive regulation of epithelial cell proliferation; smoothened signaling pathway involved in regulation of cerebellar granule cell precursor cell proliferation; cell fate specification; protein stabilization; positive regulation of organ growth; negative regulation of apoptotic process; negative regulation of transcription by RNA polymerase II; developmental growth; osteoblast differentiation; determination of left/right asymmetry in lateral mesoderm; cerebral cortex development; regulation of gene expression; homeostasis of number of cells within a tissue; dorsal/ventral neural tube patterning; negative regulation of transcription, DNA-templated; dorsal/ventral pattern formation; myoblast migration; positive regulation of hh target transcription factor activity; ventral midline determination; cell development; astrocyte activation; heart morphogenesis; mesenchymal to epithelial transition involved in metanephric renal vesicle formation; somite development; mammary gland epithelial cell differentiation; multicellular organism development; positive regulation of gene expression; determination of left/right symmetry; skeletal muscle fiber development; neural crest cell migration; positive regulation of cell population proliferation; protein localization to nucleus; digestive tract development; negative regulation of epithelial cell differentiation; left/right axis specification; anterior/posterior pattern specification; positive regulation of transcription by RNA polymerase II; signal transduction; midgut development; non-canonical Wnt signaling pathway; canonical Wnt signaling pathway
Sources:Amigo / QuickGO
Orthologs
Databases	NCBI: entry; OMA: entry
Species	Human	Mouse
Entrez	6608	319757
Ensembl	ENSG00000128602	ENSMUSG00000001761
UniProt	Q99835	P56726
RefSeq (mRNA)	NM_005631	NM_176996
RefSeq (protein)	NP_005622	NP_795970
Location (UCSC)	Chr 7: 129.19 – 129.21 Mb	Chr 6: 29.74 – 29.76 Mb
PubMed search
- Wikidata
View/Edit Human	View/Edit Mouse

Smoothened is a protein that in humans is encoded by the SMO gene. Smoothened is a Class Frizzled (Class F) G protein-coupled receptor that is a component of the hedgehog signaling pathway and is conserved from flies to humans. It is the molecular target of the natural teratogen cyclopamine. It also is the target of vismodegib, the first hedgehog pathway inhibitor to be approved by the U.S. Food and Drug Administration (FDA).

Smoothened (Smo) is a key transmembrane protein that is a key component of the hedgehog signaling pathway, a cell-cell communication system critical for embryonic development and adult tissue homeostasis. Mutations in proteins that relay Hh signals between cells cause birth defects and cancer. The protein that carries the Hh signal across the membrane is the oncoprotein and G-protein coupled receptor (GPCR) Smoothened (Smo). Smo is regulated by a separate transmembrane receptor for Hh ligands called Patched (Ptc). Ptc itself is a tumor suppressor that keeps the Hh pathway off by inhibiting Smo. The excessive Hh signaling that drives human skin and brain cancer is most frequently caused by inactivating mutations in Ptc or by gain of function mutations in Smo. While direct Smo agonists and antagonists, such as SAG and vismodegib, can bind to and activate or inhibit Smo, how Ptc inhibits Smo endogenously remains a mystery in the field.

Smo is targeted and inhibited directly by a small-molecule drug, vismodegib, for the treatment of advanced basal cell cancer, however widespread resistance to this drug has become a prevalent issue. Therapeutic research aims to identify Ptc responsive sites on Smo in order to find another method to target Smo activity in Hh-driven cancers.

== Function ==
Overview of signal transduction pathways involved in apoptosis

Cellular localization plays an essential role in the function of SMO, which anchors to the cell membrane as a 7-pass transmembrane protein. Stimulation of the patched 12-pass transmembrane receptor by the sonic hedgehog ligand leads to translocation of SMO to the primary cilium in vertebrates in a process that involves the exit of patched from the primary cilium, where it normally localizes in its unstimulated state. Vertebrate SMO that is mutated in the domain required for ciliary localisation often cannot contribute to hedgehog pathway activation. Conversely, SMO can become constitutively localized to the primary cilium and potentially activate pathway signaling constitutively as a result of a tryptophan to leucine mutation in the aforementioned domain. SMO has been shown to move during patched stimulation from the plasma membrane near the primary cilium to the ciliary membrane itself via a lateral transport pathway along the membrane, as opposed to via directed transport by vesicles. The cAMP-PKA pathway is known to promote the lateral movement of SMO and hedgehog signal transduction in general. In invertebrates like Drosophila, SMO does not organize at cilia and instead is generally translocated to the plasma membrane following hedgehog binding to patched.

After cellular localization, SMO must additionally be activated by a distinct mechanism in order to stimulate hedgehog signal transduction, but that mechanism is unknown. There is evidence for the existence of an unidentified endogenous ligand that binds SMO and activates it. It is believed that mutations in SMO can mimic the ligand-induced conformation of SMO and activate constitutive signal transduction.

SMO plays a key role in transcriptional repression and activation by the zinc-finger transcription factor Cubitus interruptus (Ci; known as Gli in vertebrates). When the hedgehog pathway is inactive, a complex of Fused (Fu), Suppressor of Fused (Sufu), and the kinesin motor protein Costal-2 (Cos2) tether Ci to microtubules. In this complex, Cos2 promotes proteolytic cleavage of Ci by activating hyperphosphorylation of Ci and subsequent recruitment of ubiquitin ligase; the cleaved Ci goes on to act as a repressor of hedgehog-activated transcription. However, when hedgehog signaling is active, Ci remains intact and acts as a transcriptional activator of the same genes that its cleaved form suppresses. SMO has been shown to bind Costal-2 and play a role in the localization of the Ci complex and prevention of Ci cleavage. Additionally, it is known that vertebrate SMO contributes to the activation of Gli as a transcription factor via association with ciliary structures such as Evc2, but these mechanisms are not fully understood.

== Endogenous activation ==
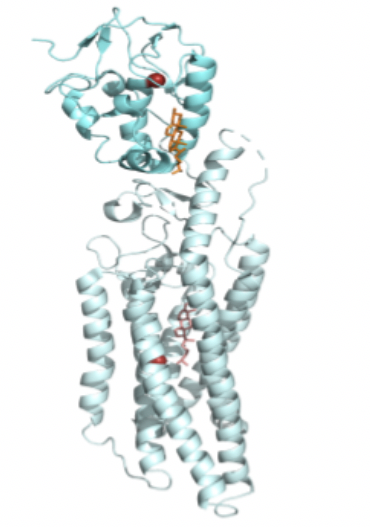
Sterol Binding Sites in Smo CRD and TMD

A leading hypothesis in the field is that Patched regulates Smoothened by regulating access to cholesterol or a related substance. It has been proposed that cholesterol activates Smo, and subsequently Hh signaling, by entering the active site through a hydrophobic "oxysterol tunnel", which can adopt open or closed conformations to allow for activation or inactivation of Smo, respectively, due to allowed sterol binding. Shh would work by inhibiting Ptc, which would increase accessible cholesterol concentrations and allow for the activation of Smo and transmission of the Hh signal. A recent crystal structure has identified two sterol binding sites in Smo, but which site is endogenously regulated by Ptc remains to be determined. The potential sites of regulation include the extracellular cysteine-rich domain (CRD) of Smo, as well as a site deep within the transmembrane domain (TMD).

Due to the abundance of cholesterol in the plasma membrane (up to 50 mole %), it has also been proposed that Ptc regulates the activity of Smo by controlling cholesterol accessibility specifically within the membrane of the primary cilia, which contains a less abundant, and therefore more readily regulated pool of accessible cholesterol.

Typically, upon activation and release of inhibition by Ptc, Smo will relocate to the primary cilia and Ptc will diffuse out of the ciliary membrane. Upon inactivation, Smo no longer becomes concentrated in the ciliary membrane, This hypothesis is supported by methods which can increase or deplete the accessible cholesterol pool, with a subsequent increase or decrease in Hh signaling. This accessible cholesterol pool has been shown to be distinct from the general plasma membrane cholesterol pool in being available for protein interaction and cell uptake. The ciliary membrane has also been shown to contain lower levels of accessible cholesterol due to sequestering of cholesterol by sphingomyelin. In addition to cholesterol's role as a Hh pathway agonist, it has been shown that cholesterol levels within the ciliary membrane rapidly increase upon treatment with Shh only in the presence of Ptc, further suggesting Ptc regulation of accessible cholesterol as the mechanism behind Smo activation/inhibition. Additionally, Molecular Dynamics simulations suggest that vismodegib inhibits Smo through a conformational change that prevents cholesterol from binding. This suggests the hypothesis that Ptc functions by preventing Smo access to cholesterol, and upon Ptc inhibition by Shh, Smo gains access to cholesterol and is subsequently activated, transmitting the Hh signal.

== Role in disease ==
SMO can function as an oncogene. Activating SMO mutations can lead to unregulated activation of the hedgehog pathway and serve as driving mutations for cancers such as medulloblastoma, basal-cell carcinoma, pancreatic cancer, and prostate cancer. As such, SMO is an attractive cancer drug target, along with the many hedgehog pathway agonists and antagonists that are known to directly target SMO.

Cholesterol is known to be crucial in regulating the overall hedgehog pathway, and congenital mutations in cholesterol synthesis pathways can inactivate SMO specifically, leading to developmental disorders. For example, oxysterol 20(S)-OHC is known to activate vertebrate SMO by binding the cysteine rich domain near its extracellular amino-terminal region. In the context of cancer, 20(S)-OHC is the target of a proposed anti-cancer oxysterol binding inhibitor.

== Agonists ==
- Smoothened agonist (SAG)
- Purmorphamine
- Oxysterols including 20(S)-OHC and 20(S)-yne

== Antagonists ==
- Cyclopamine
- Itraconazole
- Vismodegib (Erivedge), a smoothened receptor inhibitor for the treatment of basal-cell carcinoma, being investigated for the treatment of other types of cancer
- SANT-1
- Sonidegib
- Patidegib
- Glasdegib
- Jervine
