= Sagging =

Sagging may refer to:

- Sagging (fashion), a fashion trend for wearing pants below the waist to expose one's underwear
- Sagging (naval), the stress a ship is put under when it passes over the trough of a wave
- Sagging (nautical architecture), see hogging and sagging
- Ptosis (breasts), the relaxing of breast's structures due to aging
- Sagging belly

== See also ==
- Sagaing (disambiguation)
- Saggin
- Sagin
- Sag (disambiguation)
