= SAAG =

SAAG or saag may refer to:

- Sagarika (born 1970), Indian singer and actress, nicknamed Saag
- Serum-ascites albumin gradient
- Saag, an Indian foodstuff
- Saag (surname)

== See also ==
- Sag (disambiguation)
- Sagarika (disambiguation)
