= Allocetraria corrugata =

Scientific classification
- Kingdom: Fungi
- Division: Ascomycota
- Class: Lecanoromycetes
- Order: Lecanorales
- Family: Parmeliaceae
- Genus: Allocetraria
- Species: A. corrugata

Binomial name
- Allocetraria corrugata R.F.Wang, X.L.Wei & J.C.Wei (2015)

Synonyms
- Cetraria corrugata (R.F.Wang, X.L.Wei & J.C.Wei) Divakar, A.Crespo & Lumbsch (2017)

Species of lichen-forming fungus

Allocetraria corrugata is a species of foliose lichen in the family Parmeliaceae. It is found in high-elevation locations in Yunnan, China, where it grows on rocks with mosses.

== Taxonomy ==
The lichen was described as a new species in 2015 by Rui-Fang Wang, Xin-Li Wei, and Jiang-Chun Wei. The type specimen was collected from the Meili Snow Mountains at an altitude of 4,400 m (14,400 ft). The specific epithet corrugata refers to the corrugated surfaces of the lobes.

In 2017, Divakar and colleagues proposed to synonymize genus Allocetraria (and several other Parmeliaceae genera) with Cetraria, which would result in a name change to Cetraria corrugata. The proposal was rejected by later taxonomists.

== Description ==
The lichen thallus comprises narrow, slightly inflated lobes measuring 1–4 mm wide and 200–450 μm thick. Its surface colour is green to greenish-yellow, and it has a strongly wrinkled texture. Apothecia are absent, but there are pycnidia that appear as small black dots both immersed in the thallus and elevated on the surface. Allocetraria corrugata contains the secondary chemicals usnic acid, fumarprotocetraric acid, and protocetraric acid. The lichen, known to occur only in Yunnan Province, grows on rocks with mosses.

Allocetraria isidiigera is somewhat similar in appearance, but differs from A. corrugata in its shorter lobes, the presence of isidia, and slightly smaller conidia.
