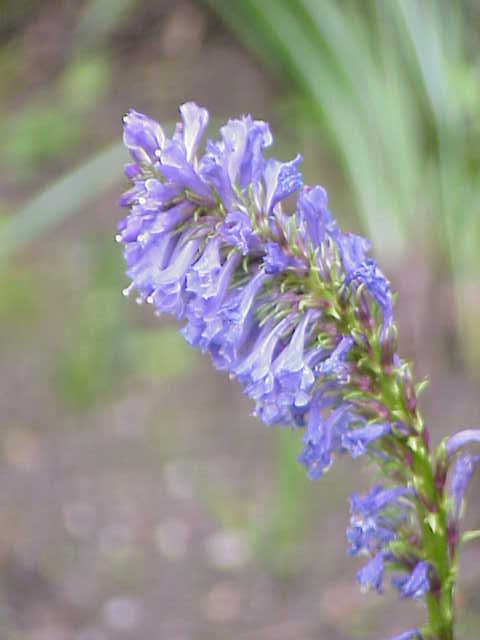
- Wulfenia carinthiaca inflorescence

Scientific classification
- Kingdom: Plantae
- Clade: Tracheophytes
- Clade: Angiosperms
- Clade: Eudicots
- Clade: Asterids
- Order: Lamiales
- Family: Plantaginaceae
- Tribe: Veroniceae
- Genus: Wulfenia; Jacq.

= Wulfenia =

Genus of flowering plants

Wulfenia is a plant genus in the family Plantaginaceae. The genus was named after Franz Xaver von Wulfen (1728–1805), an Austrian botanist, zoologist, mineralogist, alpinist, and Jesuit priest. It was first described in 1781 by Nikolaus Joseph von Jacquin in . It is also in Tribe Veroniceae.

Its native range is from Central Europe (Italy, Albania, Austria and Balkans) to southern Turkey and northern Lebanon and Syria in western Asia.

== Species ==
Accepted by Plants of the World Online;

- Wulfenia baldaccii Degen
- Wulfenia carinthiaca Jacq.
- Wulfenia glanduligera (Hub.-Mor.) Surina
- Wulfenia orientalis Boiss.

The genus is recognized by the United States Department of Agriculture and the Agricultural Research Service, but they only list the following species; Wulfenia amherstiana Benth., Wulfenia baldaccii Degen and Wulfenia carinthiaca Jacq.
