= Naßfeld Pass =

Mountain pass between Austria and Italy

Nassfeld Pass
- Passo di Pramollo
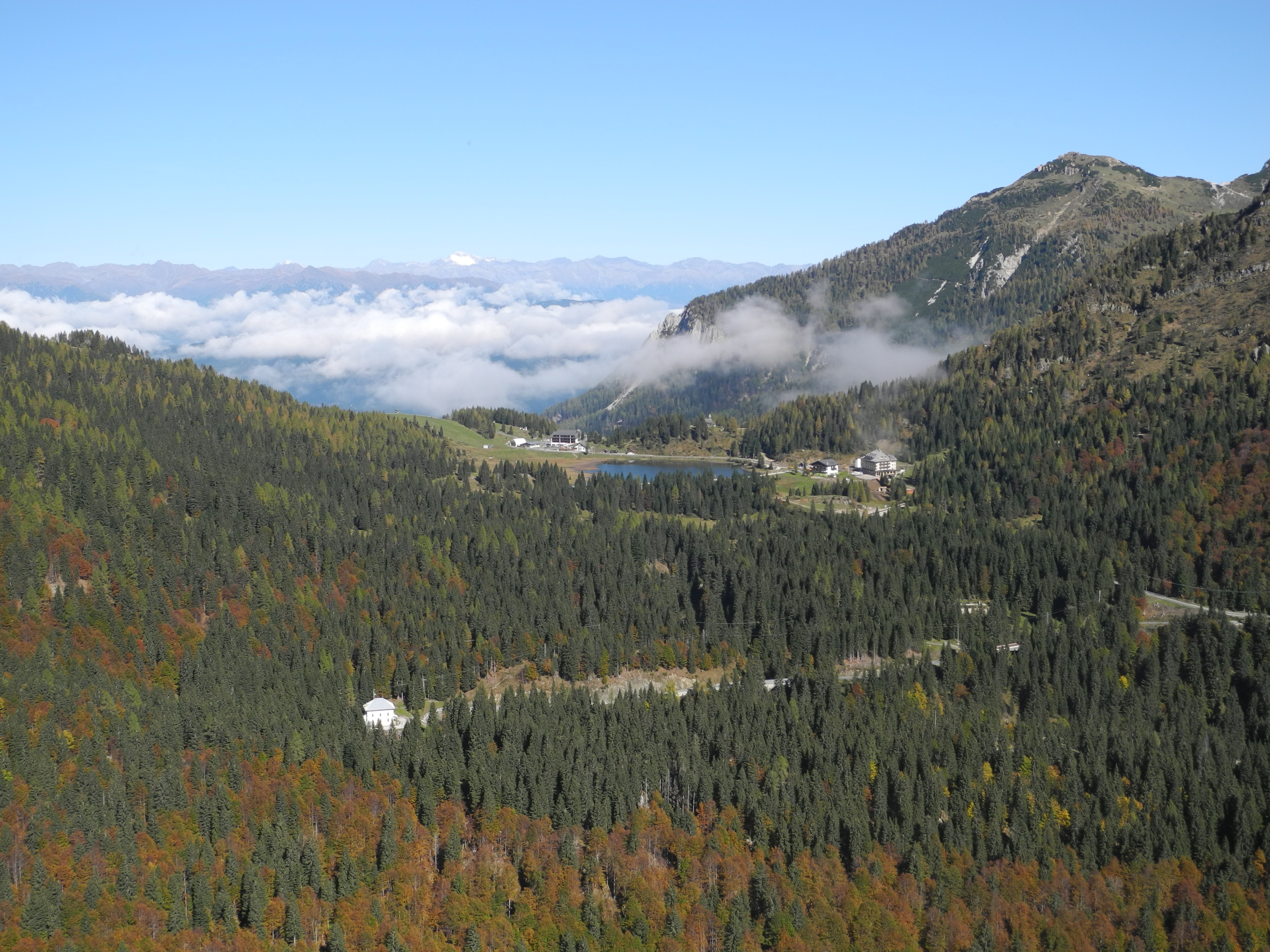
- Pass height

- Location within Alps
- Elevation: 1,530 metres (5,020 ft)

Third Approach
- Location: Austria–Italy border
- Range: Carnic Alps
- Coordinates: 46°33′36″N 13°16′32″E

Nassfeld Pass (Italian: Passo di Pramollo, Slovene: Mokrine) is a 1,530-metre-high (5,020 ft) mountain pass connecting Hermagor in the Austrian state of Carinthia with Pontebba in the Italian region of Friuli-Venezia Giulia.

It is located in the Carnic Alps between the Gail valley in the north and the Italian Canal Valley (Valcanale) in the south. Surrounding peaks include Mt. Gartnerkofel and Mt Trogkofel. On the Austrian side is the Nassfeld ski resort, the largest in Carinthia.

During the Middle Ages, Naßfeld Pass was part of an important trade route between the Duchy of Carinthia and the Republic of Venice. It lost its significance with the extension of mountain roads via neighbouring Tarvis and Predil Pass. Several expansion projects were started from the 17th century onwards, however, the present-day highway was not built until 1915 amidst World War I, when the Austro-Hungarian Army urged for a transport route to the Italian Front. Like at nearby Plöcken Pass, Naßfeld saw heavy fighting when Italian Alpini troops tried to push northwards into Carinthia.

== See also ==
- List of highest paved roads in Europe
- List of mountain passes
