= Andres Saag =

Estonian mycologist (born 1955)

Andres Saag (born 21 November 1955) is an Estonian mycologist.

He has recombined the following taxon: Nephromopsis yunnanensis (Nyl.) Randlane & Saag, 1992.

His publications include Eesti puudel kasvavad suursamblikud (Epiphytic macrolichens of Estonia), Eesti kividel kasvavad suursamblikud (Epilithic macrolichens of Estonia) and Eesti maapinna suursamblikud (Epigeic macrolichens of Estonia), all co-authored with Tiina Randlane and Ljudmilla Martin.

== See also ==
- Aino Kalda
