= Allocetraria ambigua =

Scientific classification
- Kingdom: Fungi
- Division: Ascomycota
- Class: Lecanoromycetes
- Order: Lecanorales
- Family: Parmeliaceae
- Genus: Allocetraria
- Species: A. ambigua

Binomial name
- Allocetraria ambigua (C.Bab.) Kurok. & M.J.Lai (1991)

Synonyms
- Cetraria ambigna C.Bab. (1852); Platysma ambignum (C.Bab.) Nyl. (1857); Platysma ambiguum (C.Bab.) Nyl. (1858)

Species of lichen-forming fungus

Allocetraria ambigua is a species of foliose lichen in the family Parmeliaceae. It is an alpine species recorded chiefly from the Himalayas and adjacent parts of western China, where it grows mainly on soil. Like other yellow members of its group, it contains usnic acid, a compound that contributes to its colour.

== Taxonomy ==
Allocetraria ambigua was first described by Cardale Babington in 1852 as Cetraria ambigua, based on Himalayan material collected in Garhwal (India) on wood and mosses at high elevation. The lectotype is housed at the Natural History Museum, London (BM). The species was later transferred to the genus Allocetraria by Syo Kurokawa and Ming-Jou Lai in 1991, reflecting a revised circumscription of yellow, usnic acid-containing cetrarioid lichens in the Parmeliaceae.

== Description ==
The thallus is foliose and dorsiventral (with distinct upper and lower surfaces), and is pale yellow on both sides. The lobes are narrow and elongate (to about 4 mm wide) and are typically clearly concave on the upper side, especially towards the lobe tips; the medulla is white. In the field it can be confused with Flavocetraria nivalis or Allocetraria stracheyi where they grow together, but A. ambigua tends to have a thinner, smoother thallus than F. nivalis (which is strongly wrinkled/foveolate), and it differs from A. stracheyi in the consistently concave lobes (A. stracheyi is more often convex above when clearly dorsiventral).

Chemically, the cortex contains usnic acid. The medulla contains lichesterinic–protolichesterinic-type fatty acids, and some specimens have been reported to contain secalonic acids (A and/or C). Where identification is uncertain, the genus-level distinction from superficially similar yellow cetrarioid taxa can be supported by checking the pycnoconidia (filiform in Allocetraria, versus bifusiform in Flavocetraria).

== Habitat and distribution ==
Allocetraria ambigua occurs mainly in the Himalayas. It has been reported from China (including Qinghai, Shaanxi, Sichuan, and Xizang), India, and Nepal. It grows primarily on soil in alpine meadows, and is only rarely found at the bases of small shrubs.

Across its known range it is associated with high-elevation alpine habitats, with reported collections spanning roughly 2,800–5,600 m elevation.
