= Purmorphamine =

Chemical compound

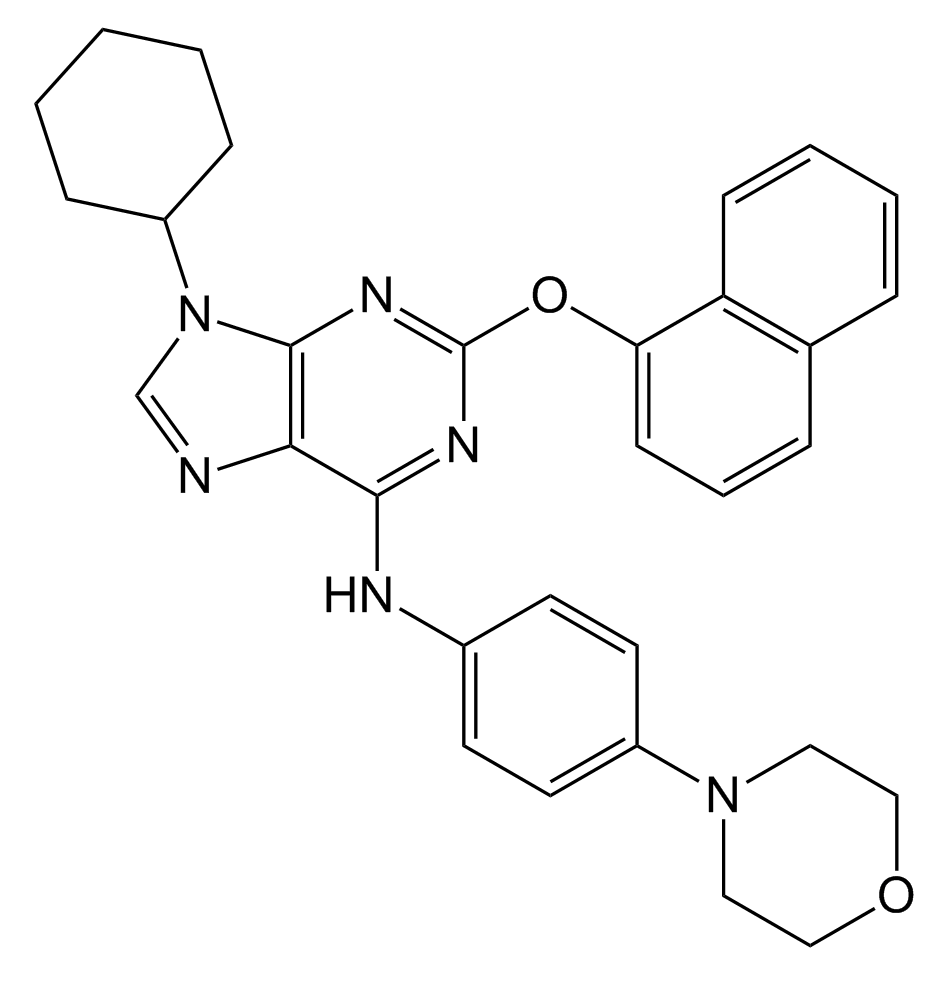

Identifiers
- IUPAC name: 9-cyclohexyl-N-(4-morpholinophenyl)-2-(naphthalen-1-yloxy)-9H-purin-6-amine
- CAS Number: 483367-10-8
- PubChem CID: 5284329
- ChemSpider: 4447411
- UNII: PB12M2F8KY
- CompTox Dashboard (EPA): DTXSID20415293

Chemical and physical data
- Formula: C_{31}H_{32}N_{6}O_{2}
- Molar mass: 520.637 g·mol^{−1}
- 3D model (JSmol): Interactive image
- SMILES: C1(N(C2CCCCC2)C=N3)=C3C(NC4=CC=C(N5CCOCC5)C=C4)=NC(OC6=CC=CC7=C6C=CC=C7)=N1
- InChI: InChI=1S/C31H32N6O2/c1-2-9-25(10-3-1)37-21-32-28-29(33-23-13-15-24(16-14-23)36-17-19-38-20-18-36)34-31(35-30(28)37)39-27-12-6-8-22-7-4-5-11-26(22)27/h4-8,11-16,21,25H,1-3,9-10,17-20H2,(H,33,34,35); Key:FYBHCRQFSFYWPY-UHFFFAOYSA-N

Purmorphamine was the first small-molecule agonist developed for the protein Smoothened, a key part of the hedgehog signaling pathway, which is involved in bone growth, cardiovascular regeneration and brain development as well as having a number of other functions in the body. Purmorphamine has been shown to induce osteogenesis in bone tissue as well as influencing growth and differentiation of neurons in the brain.
