= Plectenchyma =

General term for fungal tissues

Plectenchyma (from Greek πλέκω pleko 'I weave' and ἔγχυμα enchyma 'infusion', i.e., 'a woven tissue') is the general term employed to designate all types of fungal tissues.

The two most common types of tissues are prosenchyma and pseudoparenchyma.

The hyphae specifically become fused together.
