= Sagaing (disambiguation) =

Sagaing is a town in Sagaing Township, Sagaing District, Sagaing Region, Myanmar. It may also refer to:

== Places ==
- Sagaing Region (formerly called Sagaing Division), Myanmar; a region of Myanmar, whose capital is the town of Monywa
- Sagaing District, Sagaing Region, Myanmar; a district of Myanmar whose capital is the town of Sagaing
- Sagaing Township, Sagaing District, Sagaing Region, Myanmar; a township of Myanmar whose capital is the town of Sagaing
- Sagaing Kingdom (1315–1365), a former kingdom in what is now Myanmar
- Sagaing Fault, a tectonic fault located in Myanmar

== People ==
- Sagaing Min (1784–1846), a king of Burma
- Sagaing Tipiṭaka Sayadaw (စစ်ကိုင်းတိပိဋကဆရာတော်; 1968–2022), a Burmese Buddhist monk

== Other uses ==
- Sagaing United F.C., Monywa, Sagaing Region, Myanmar; a soccer club
- SS Sagaing (1924–1943), a cargo and passenger steamship

== See also ==
- Sagaing earthquake (disambiguation)
- Saging
- Sagging (disambiguation)
