= Smoothened agonist =

Chemical compound

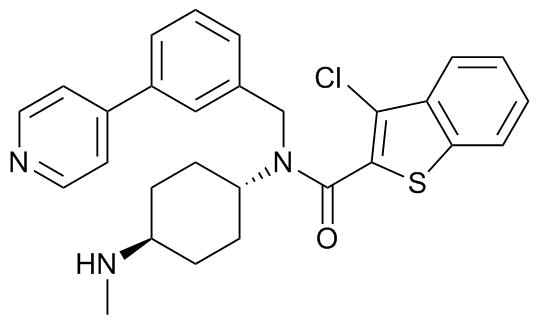

Identifiers
- IUPAC name: 3-chloro-N-[(1r,4r)-4-(methylamino)cyclohexyl]-N-[3-(pyridin-4-yl)benzyl]benzo[b]thiophene-2-carboxamide
- CAS Number: 912545-86-9 364590-63-6 (hydrochloride)
- PubChem CID: 5284330
- ChemSpider: 21541484
- UNII: 4XN97SZK4J
- ChEBI: CHEBI:138438
- CompTox Dashboard (EPA): DTXSID80415294

Chemical and physical data
- Formula: C_{28}H_{28}ClN_{3}OS
- Molar mass: 490.06 g·mol^{−1}
- 3D model (JSmol): Interactive image
- SMILES: ClC1=C(C(N([C@H]2CC[C@H](NC)CC2)CC3=CC=CC(C4=CC=NC=C4)=C3)=O)SC5=CC=CC=C51
- InChI: InChI=1S/C28H28ClN3OS/c1-30-22-9-11-23(12-10-22)32(28(33)27-26(29)24-7-2-3-8-25(24)34-27)18-19-5-4-6-21(17-19)20-13-15-31-16-14-20/h2-8,13-17,22-23,30H,9-12,18H2,1H3/t22-,23-; Key:VFSUUTYAEQOIMW-YHBQERECSA-N

Smoothened agonist (SAG) was one of the first small-molecule agonists developed for the protein Smoothened, a key part of the hedgehog signaling pathway, which is involved in brain development as well as having a number of other functions in the body.

Smoothened agonist has been shown to aid proliferation and survival of developing neurons, and prevent drug-induced brain injury. When injected into the cerebellum of newborn mice with an induced Down syndrome-like condition, Smoothened agonist was able to stimulate normal cerebellum development, resulting in significant behavioural improvement once the mice had grown to adulthood.

Smoothened Agonist was capable of inducing androgen production in both prostate and bone stromal cells that was significantly greater than even similarly treated prostate cancer cells.

The substance has been used as part of a chemical cocktail to turn old and senescent human cells back into young ones (as measured by transcriptomic age), without turning them all the way back into undifferentiated stem cells.
