= Aino Kalda =

Estonian botanist (1929–2025)

- Aino Kalda (2010)
- Born: 19 August 1929; Tallinn, Estonia
- Died: 28 November 2025 (aged 96)
- Education: University of Tartu

Aino Kalda (19 August 1929 – 28 November 2025) was an Estonian botanist (including bryology).

== Life and career ==
Kalda was born in Tallinn on 19 August 1929. In 1953 she graduated from Tartu State University. From 1959 to 1973 she worked at Tartu University's plant systematics and geobotany department (Estonian: TRÜ taimesüstemaatika ja geobotaanika kateeder). From 1973 to 1996 she worked at Estonian Institute of Forestry. Kalda died on 28 November 2025, at the age of 96.

== Awards ==
- 1982: Estonian SSR State Prize
- 2004: Honorary Medal of the University of Tartu

== Works ==
- Botaanika I (1965, one of the authors)
- Botaanika II (1970, one of the authors)
- Välibotaanika (1970)
- Lahemaa rahvuspargi taimkate ja selle geobotaaniline liigestus. - Lahemaa uurimused 1988, III
- Koosluste kaitse ja kaitsealad. - Taimeriigi kaitsest Eesti NSV-s (1988)
- Eesti sammalde määraja (1998, one of the authors)
- Väike sammalde ja samblike raamat (with Tiina Randlane and Taimi Paal (2004)
- Samblad ja samblikud (booklet with Tiina Randlane) (2006)

=== Additional works ===
- Laialehised metsad Eesti NSV-s (doctoral dissertation), 1961.
- Muutused sammalkattes Looduslike niitude pealtparandamisel, 1966.
