= Lake Pressegg =

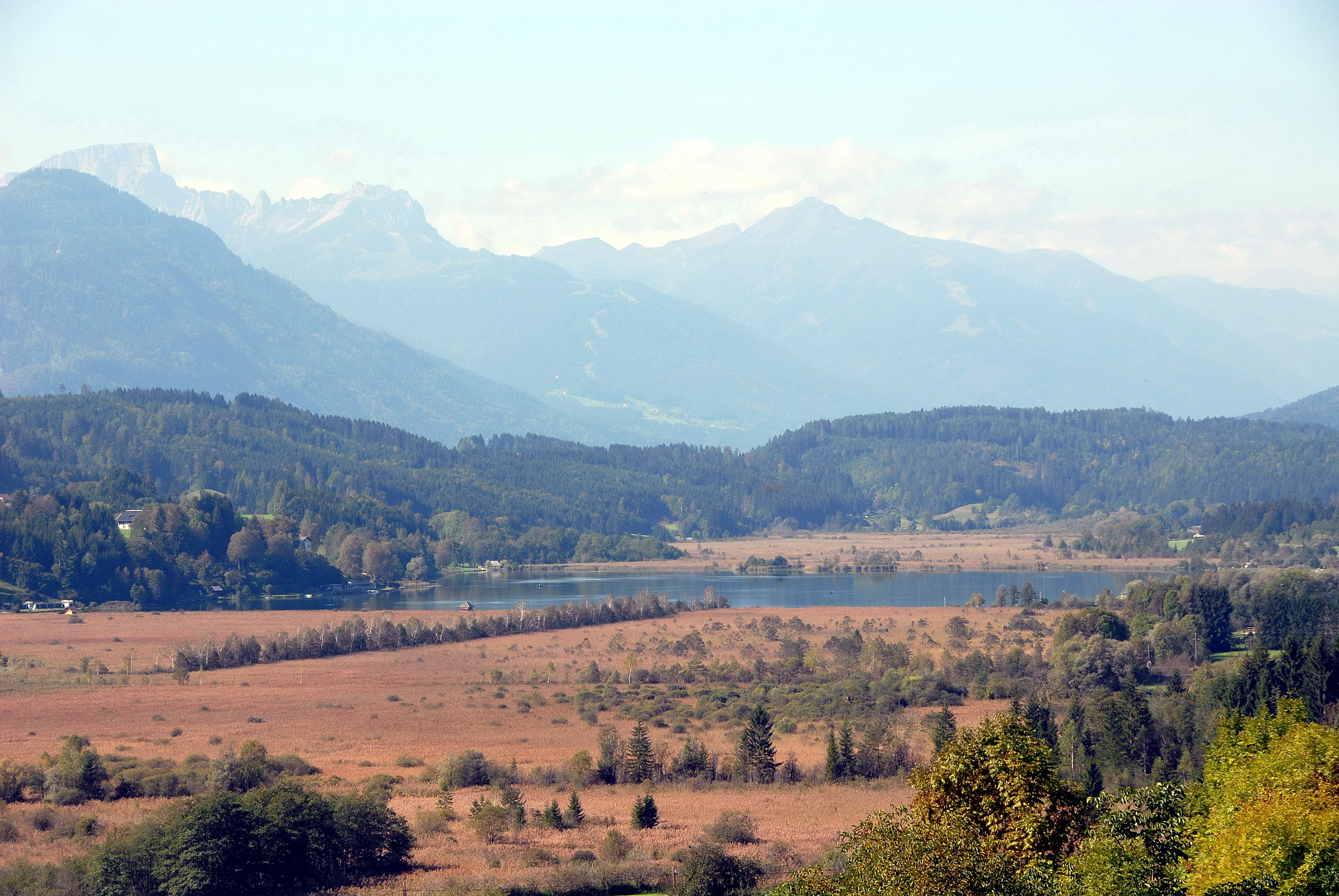

- Location within Austria
- Location: Carinthia
- Coordinates: 46°37′34″N 13°26′29″E
- Type: glacial lake
- Primary inflows: Vellacher Bach
- Primary outflows: Pressegger–Seebach to Gail river
- Catchment area: 28.74 km^{2} (11.10 sq mi)
- Basin countries: Austria
- Surface area: 0.55 km^{2} (0.21 sq mi)
- Average depth: 3.4 m (11 ft)
- Max. depth: 13.7 m (45 ft)
- Water volume: 1,878,027 m^{3} (1,522.541 acre⋅ft)
- Residence time: 0.05 years
- Surface elevation: 560 m (1,840 ft)
- Settlements: Hermagor

Lake Pressegg (German: Pressegger See, Slovene: Preseško jezero) is a lake in Carinthia, Austria. It is located in a glacial valley within the Gailtal Alps, a mountain range of the Southern Limestone Alps, east of Hermagor. With an average depth of 3.4 m (11 ft), the water body of the semi-circular lake is relatively flat. It is characterized by extended reed beds, while there are also bathing beaches on the northern and southern shore busy in summer.

In addition to underground springs, the lake is fed with water from the western side by a tributary. There is an outflow on the eastern shore.
