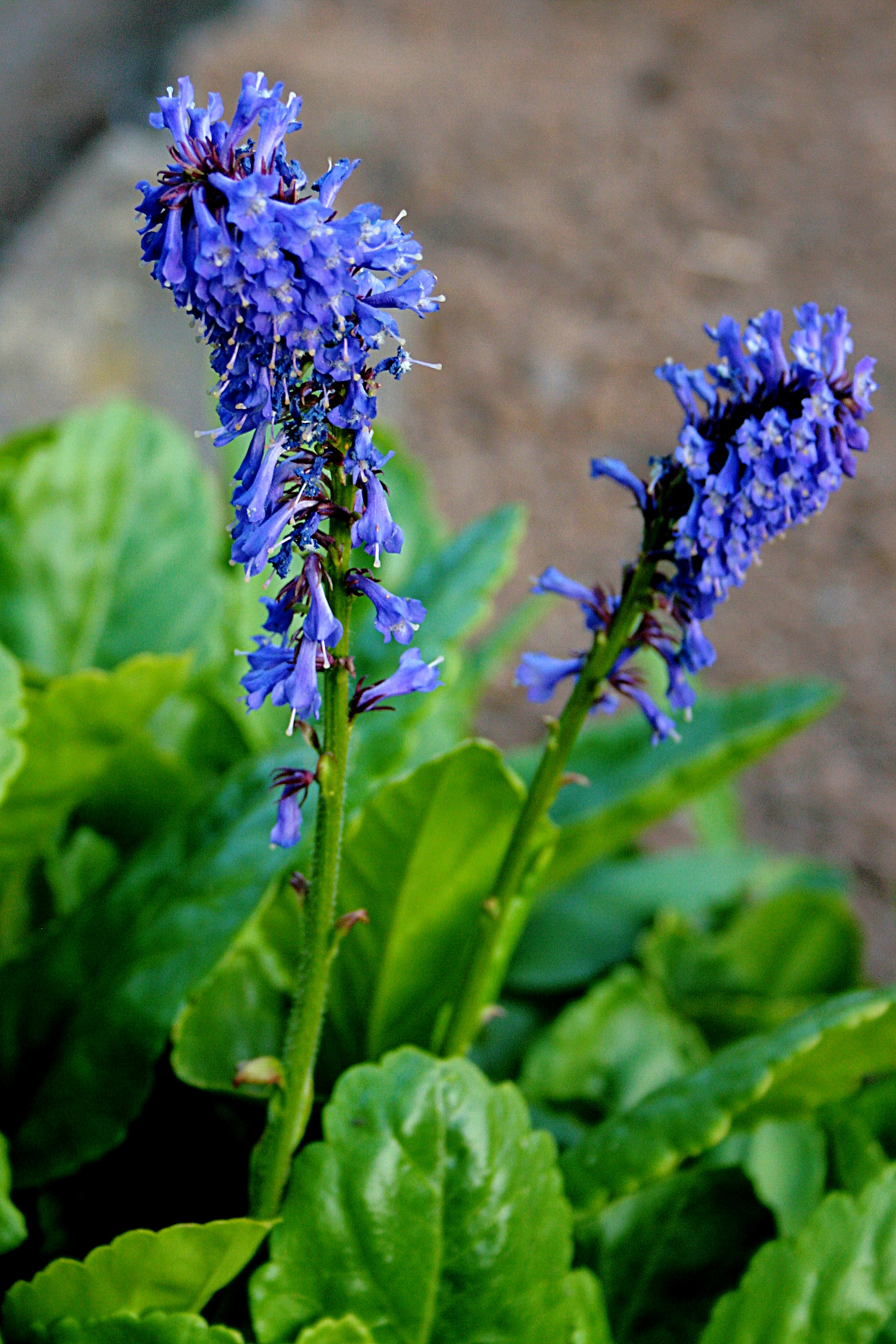

Scientific classification
- Kingdom: Plantae
- Clade: Tracheophytes
- Clade: Angiosperms
- Clade: Eudicots
- Clade: Asterids
- Order: Lamiales
- Family: Plantaginaceae
- Genus: Wulfenia
- Species: W. carinthiaca

Binomial name
- Wulfenia carinthiaca Jacq.

= Wulfenia carinthiaca =

Species of plant

Wulfenia carinthiaca, commonly known as wulfenia, is a plant in the plantain family. It is endemic to the Gartnerkofel mountain of the Carnic Alps at the Austro-Italian border. It was discovered in 1779 by Franz Xaver von Wulfen, for whom it is named.

It is cultivated as an ornamental plant.
