= Tiina Randlane =

Estonian botanist, lichenologist and mycologist

Tiina Randlane (born 10 September 1953) is an Estonian mycologist and lichenologist.

== Life and career ==
Randlane was born in Tallinn and completed her undergraduate studies at Tartu State University, graduating cum laude in 1977. She continued her studies at the same institution and obtained a candidate's degree in 1986; her thesis examined the lichen flora of Estonia's western islands.

She began working at the University of Tartu in 1975 as a technician and later became an associate professor.

Her research focuses on lichen taxonomy and ecology. She has authored around 100 scientific papers and book chapters, and has worked on the development of a global taxonomic database for cetrarioid lichens. Much of her work concerns the lichen biodiversity of Estonia and the wider Baltic region.

Randlane contributed to the compilation of Estonia's Red Data Books and later Red Lists of lichens. She served on the editorial board of Folia Cryptogamica Estonica from 1996 to 2020 and became an associate editor of The Lichenologist in 2020.

She co-authored a multilingual series on Estonian macrolichens for a general readership and helped develop online educational resources on Estonian lichens, mosses, and vascular plants. She also collected and identified nearly 7,000 specimens for the University of Tartu lichen herbarium.

Randlane received University of Tartu medals in 2003 and 2013, and in 2021 she was awarded a medal marking "100 semesters at the University of Tartu". In 2010, online identification guides she helped develop received an award for innovative science popularization in Estonia. The 60th issue of Folia Cryptogamica Estonica was dedicated to her on her 70th birthday, and it included descriptions of Pyxine tiinae, Leptogium tiinae, and Lepraria tiinae, named after her.

== See also ==
- Andres Saag
- Aino Kalda
