= Franz Xaver von Wulfen =

Austrian botanist, zoologist, mineralogist, alpinist and Jesuit priest

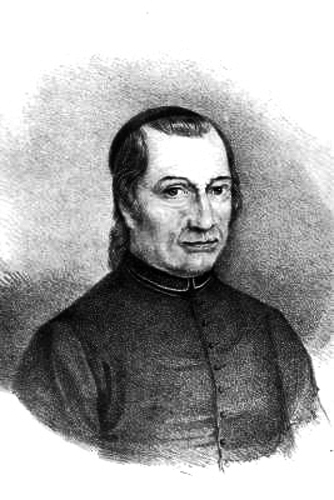
Franz Xaver von Wulfen

Franz Xaver Freiherr von Wulfen (5 November 1728 – 17 March 1805) was an Austrian botanist, zoologist, mineralogist, alpinist, and Jesuit priest. He is credited with discovering the flowering plants Wulfenia carinthiaca, Saxifraga moschata, and Stellaria bulbosa. In 1845 the lead molybdate mineral wulfenite was named in his honor by Wilhelm Karl von Haidinger.

== Life ==
Wulfen was born in Belgrade. His father, Christian Friedrich von Wulfen, was a high-ranking lieutenant in the Austrian Army of Swedish descent. His mother, née Mariassy, was a Hungarian countess. Franz's education took place at Kaschau Gymnasium in present-day Košice, Slovakia. When he was 17, he joined a Jesuit school in Vienna. Following his graduation, he became a school instructor (chiefly of mathematics and physics) in Vienna, Graz, Neusohl, Gorz, Laibach (Ljubljana), and from 1764 Klagenfurt. After the Suppression of the Society of Jesus in the 1760s, he remained in Klagenfurt until his death. By 1763, he was officially a priest. Wulfen died at the age of 76 years.

== Work ==
From his twenty-second year he devoted himself to botany. The upland and valley flora of the Eastern Alps was his chief study. To find specimens, Wulfen frequently hiked up the Großglockner and was a pioneer in exploring the Austrian Alps. In 1781, he published his studies in the well-illustrated Plantae rariorum Carinthicae (Rare Plants of Carinthia). With particular success, he conducted research of lichens that he still regarded as a division of algae. He made numerous trips to the south (on many occasions to the Adriatic Sea) and to the north as far as Holland.

Wulfen was also a researcher of the fauna of the Inner Austria and the Adriatic Sea. He concerned himself primarily with insects, fish, and birds.

== Recognitions and commemoration ==
In 1796, Wulfen was elected a foreign member of the Royal Swedish Academy of Sciences.

The genus Wulfenia (in the family Plantaginaceae) was named in 1782 in his honor by Nikolaus Joseph von Jacquin. Then in 1980 botanist D.Y.Hong published Wulfeniopsis which is a genus of flowering plants belonging to the family Plantaginaceae, it also honor's Franz Xaver von Wulfen. Also, he is commemorated in about 22 plants with the specific epithet of wulfenii. such as Dianthus wulfenii F.Dietr. and Rosa wulfenii Tratt.

A monument in Klagenfurt, was erected in 1838, honors him, describing him as "equally great as priest, scholar and man".

== Works ==
- Plantae rariores carinthiacae. V: Miscellanea austriaca ad botanicam, chemiam et historiam naturalem spectantia, vol. I (1778) str. 147–163 in vol. II (1781) str. 25-183
- Abhandlung vom Kärntner Bleispate, 1785
- Plantae rariores carinthiacae. V: Collectanea ad botanicam, chemiam et historiam naturalem, vol. I (1786) str. 186–364, vol. II (1788) str. 112–234, vol. III (1789) str. 3–166, vol. IV (1790) str. 227-348
- Descriptiones Quorumdam Capensium Insectorum, 1786
- De Plumbo Spatoso Carinthiaco, 1791
- Plantae rariores descriptae, 1803
- Cryptogama aquatica, 1803
- Flora Norica phanerogama,1858 (published posthumously like much of his work)

== See also ==
- Category:Taxa named by Franz Xaver von Wulfen
