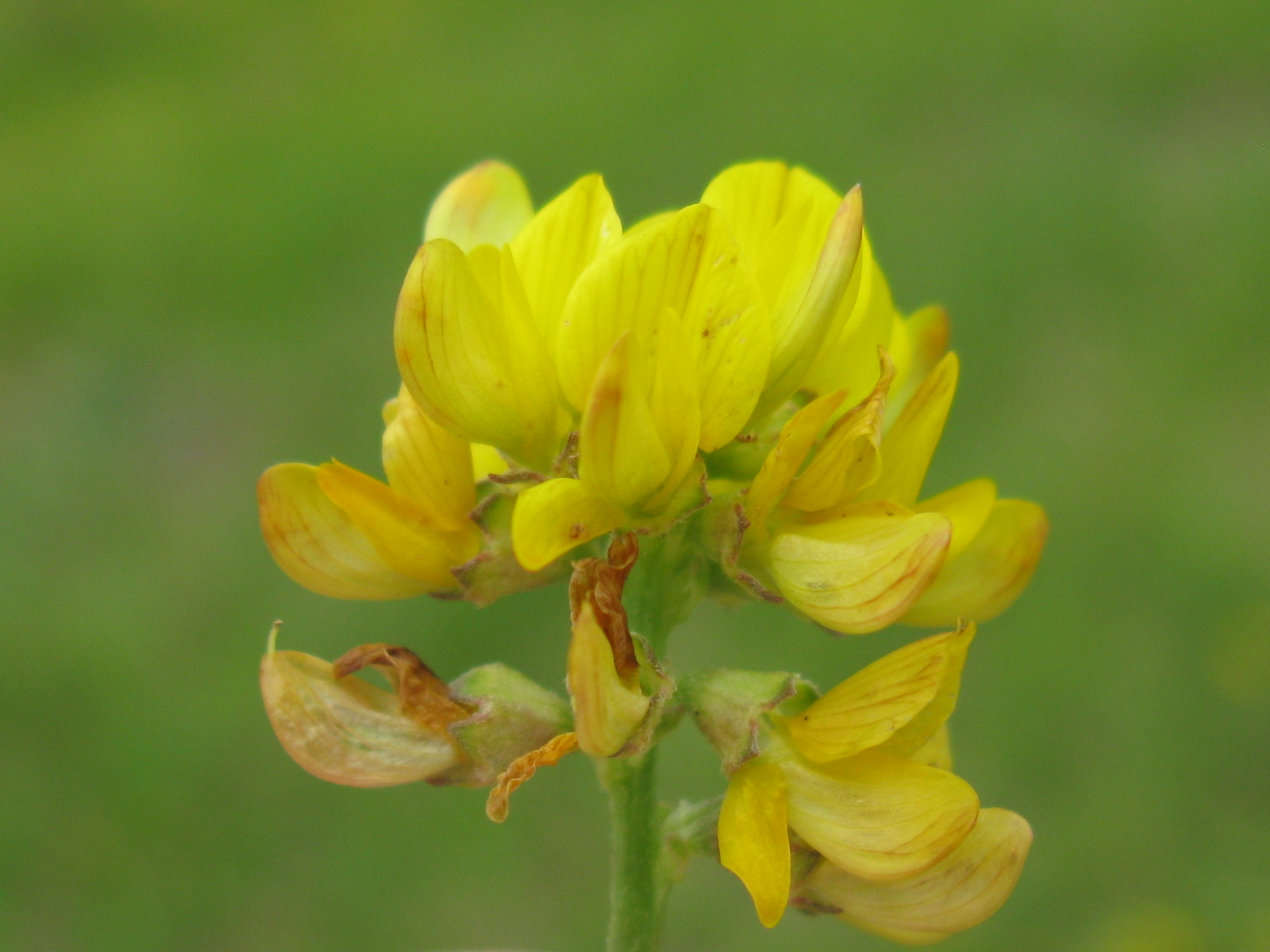
- Flowers
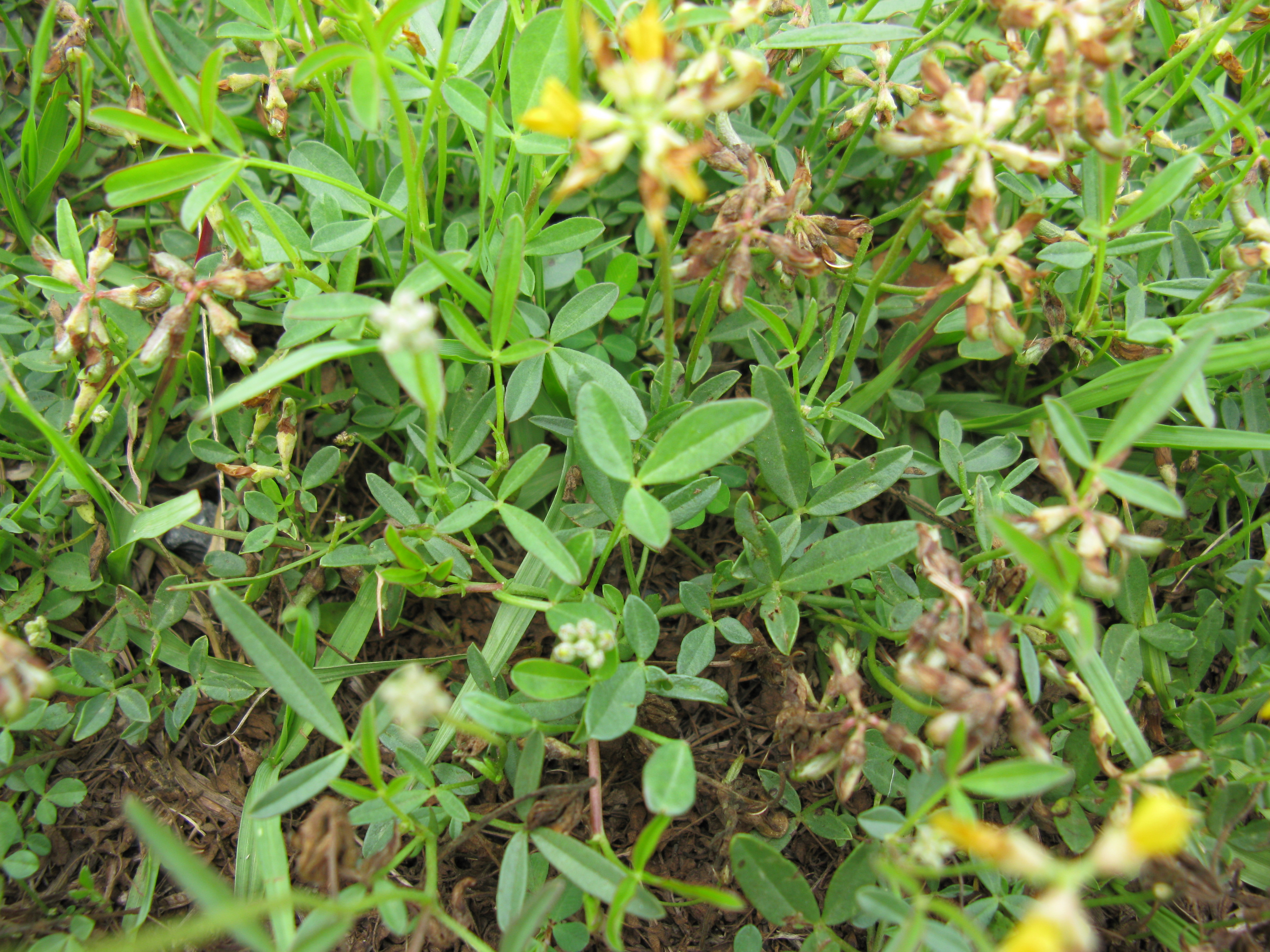
- Foliage

Scientific classification
- Kingdom: Plantae
- Clade: Tracheophytes
- Clade: Angiosperms
- Clade: Eudicots
- Clade: Rosids
- Order: Fabales
- Family: Fabaceae
- Subfamily: Faboideae
- Genus: Listia
- Species: L. bainesii

Binomial name
- Listia bainesii (Baker) B.-E.van Wyk & Boatwr.

Synonyms
- Amphinomia bainesii (Baker) A.Schreib.; Lotononis bainesii Baker; Lotononis bainesii var. pottiae Burtt Davy

= Listia bainesii =

Species of plant

Listia bainesii (syn. Lotononis bainesii) is a species of flowering plant in the family Fabaceae, native to southern Africa, and introduced as a forage to Kenya, New Guinea, eastern Australia, Taiwan, and Fiji. Relished by livestock, it is frost-tolerant to −6.5 °C (20 °F), and actually performs better under close grazing.

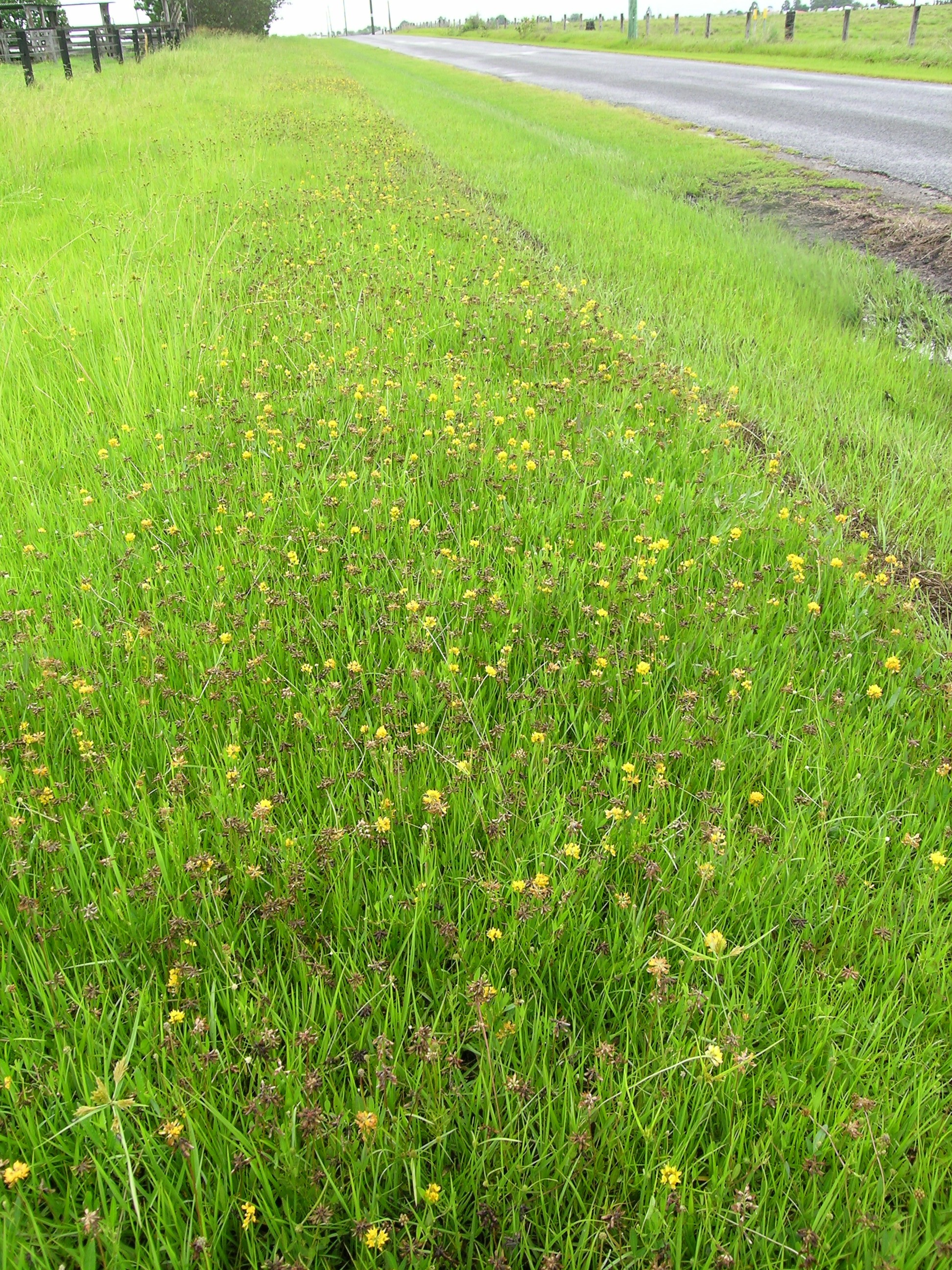
Alongside a road in Australia

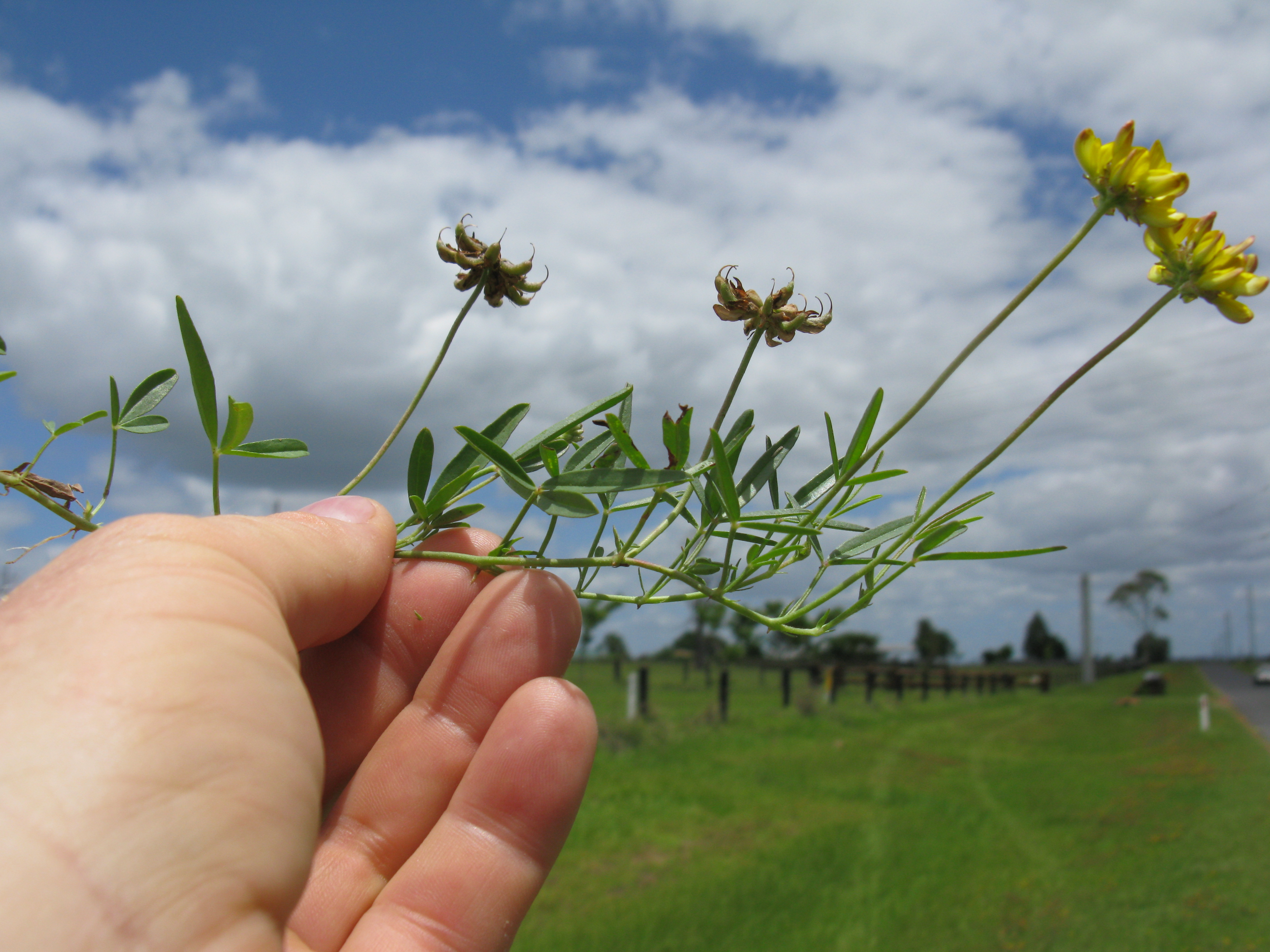
Stem, leaves, flowers and pods

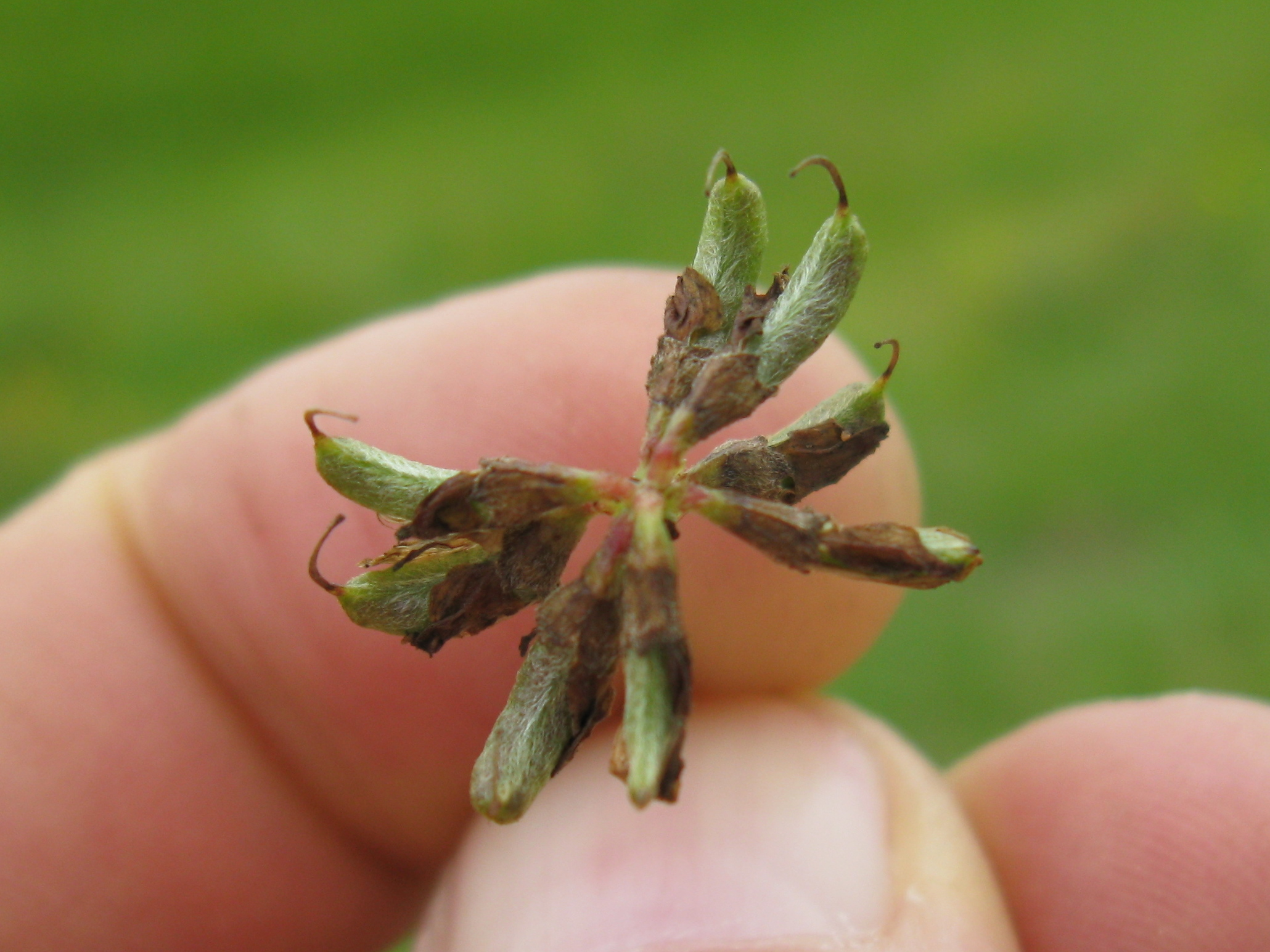
Pods
