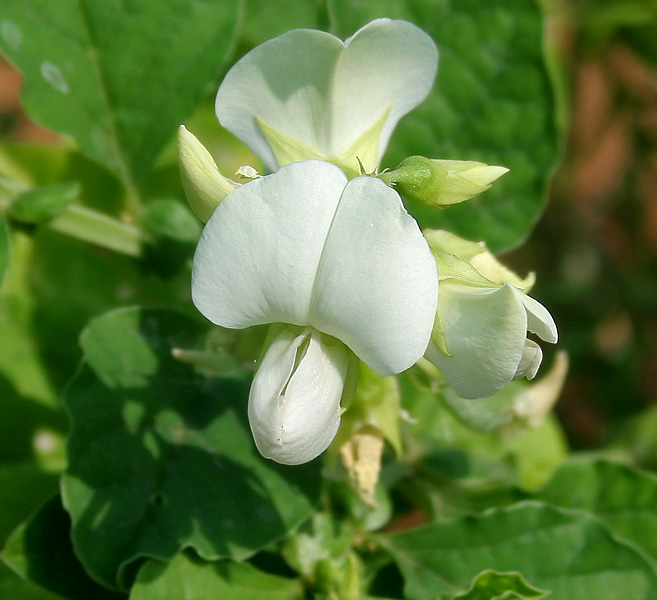
- Crotalaria verrucosa

Scientific classification
- Kingdom: Plantae
- Clade: Tracheophytes
- Clade: Angiosperms
- Clade: Eudicots
- Clade: Rosids
- Order: Fabales
- Family: Fabaceae
- Subfamily: Faboideae
- Clade: Meso-Papilionoideae
- Clade: Genistoids
- Clade: Core Genistoids
- Tribe: Crotalarieae (Benth.) Hutch.

Genera
- See text

Synonyms
- Crotalarieae L.; Borbonieae Hutch. 1964; Genisteae subtribe Crotalariinae Benth. 1865; Lotononideae Hutch. 1964

= Crotalarieae =

Tribe of legumes

Crotalarieae is a tribe of flowering plants belonging to the family Fabaceae. It includes rooibos (Aspalathus linearis), which is harvested for sale as a tisane.

== Description ==
The Crotalarieae arose 31.2 ± 3.4 million years ago (in the Oligocene). The members of this tribe consistently form a monophyletic clade in molecular phylogenetic analyses. The tribe does not currently have a node-based definition and no morphological synapomorphies have been identified. Several genera in the tribe produce quinolizidine alkaloids or macrocyclic pyrrolizidine alkaloids.

== Genera ==
Crotalarieae comprises the following genera:

- Aspalathus L.
- Bolusia Benth.
- Calobota Eckl. & Zeyh.
- Crotalaria L.
- Euchlora Eckl. & Zeyh.
- Ezoloba B.-E. van Wyk & Boatwr.
- Lebeckia Thunb.
- Leobordea Del.
- Listia E. Mey.
- Lotononis (DC.) Eckl. & Zeyh.
- Pearsonia Dummer
- Rafnia Thunb.
- Robynsiophyton R.Wilczek
- Rothia Pers.
- Wiborgia Thunb.
- Wiborgiella Boatwr. & B.-E. van Wyk
