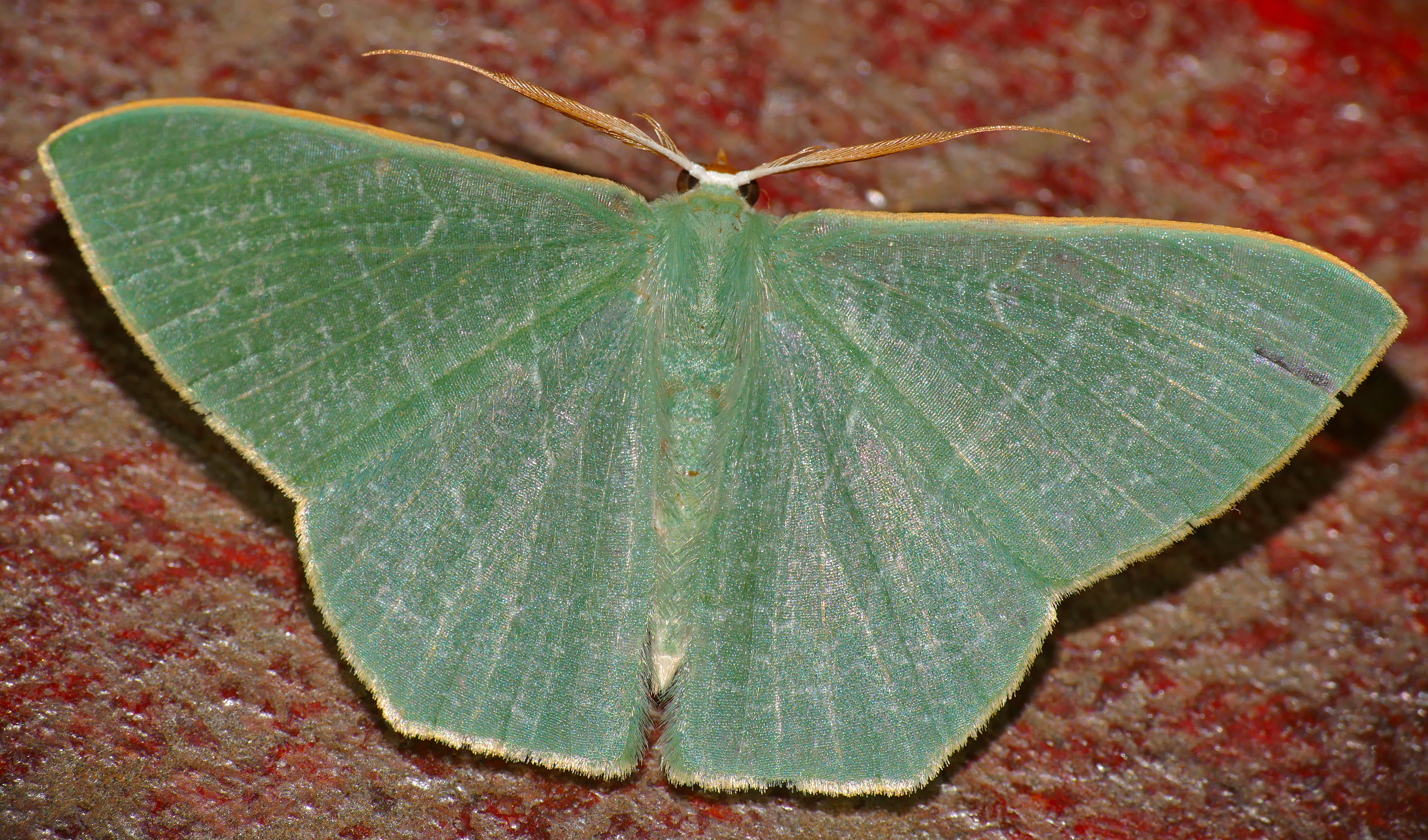

Scientific classification
- Kingdom: Animalia
- Phylum: Arthropoda
- Clade: Pancrustacea
- Class: Insecta
- Order: Lepidoptera
- Family: Geometridae
- Genus: Thalassodes
- Species: T. quadraria

Binomial name
- Thalassodes quadraria (Guenée, 1857)

Synonyms
- Nemoria aequaria (Mabille, 1898); Nemoria chlorinaria (Mabille, 1898); Geometra digressa (Walker, 1861); Thalassodes ricinaria Guenée, 1862; Hemithea sapoliaria (Swinhoe, 1904); Thalassodes subreticulata Mabille, 1900

= Thalassodes quadraria =

Species of moth

Thalassodes quadraria is a species of moth of the family Geometridae first described by Achille Guenée in 1857. It is found in Africa south of the Sahara and in India and Sri Lanka.

== Description ==
Its wingspan is about 38 mm. Hindwings with veins 3, 4 and 6, 7 stalked. Forewings with vein 11 from the cell. Forewings with veins 3, 4 stalked. Hindwings with angled outer margin. It is a bluish-green moth with reddish palpi and frons. Vertex of head white. Wings semihyaline, with numerous pale striae. Forewings with fulvous costa. Antemedial and postmedial indistinct pale straight oblique lines. Hindwings with indistinct postmedial line, produced to a point and angled at vein 3. Both wings with ochreous cilia at tips or wholly ochreous. Ventral side whitish.

Larval food plants include Ricinus communis, Mangifera indica, Rosa, Crotalaria verrucosa, Coffea arabica, Myrica aethiopica, Schinus molle, Zea mays, and Myrica serrate.
