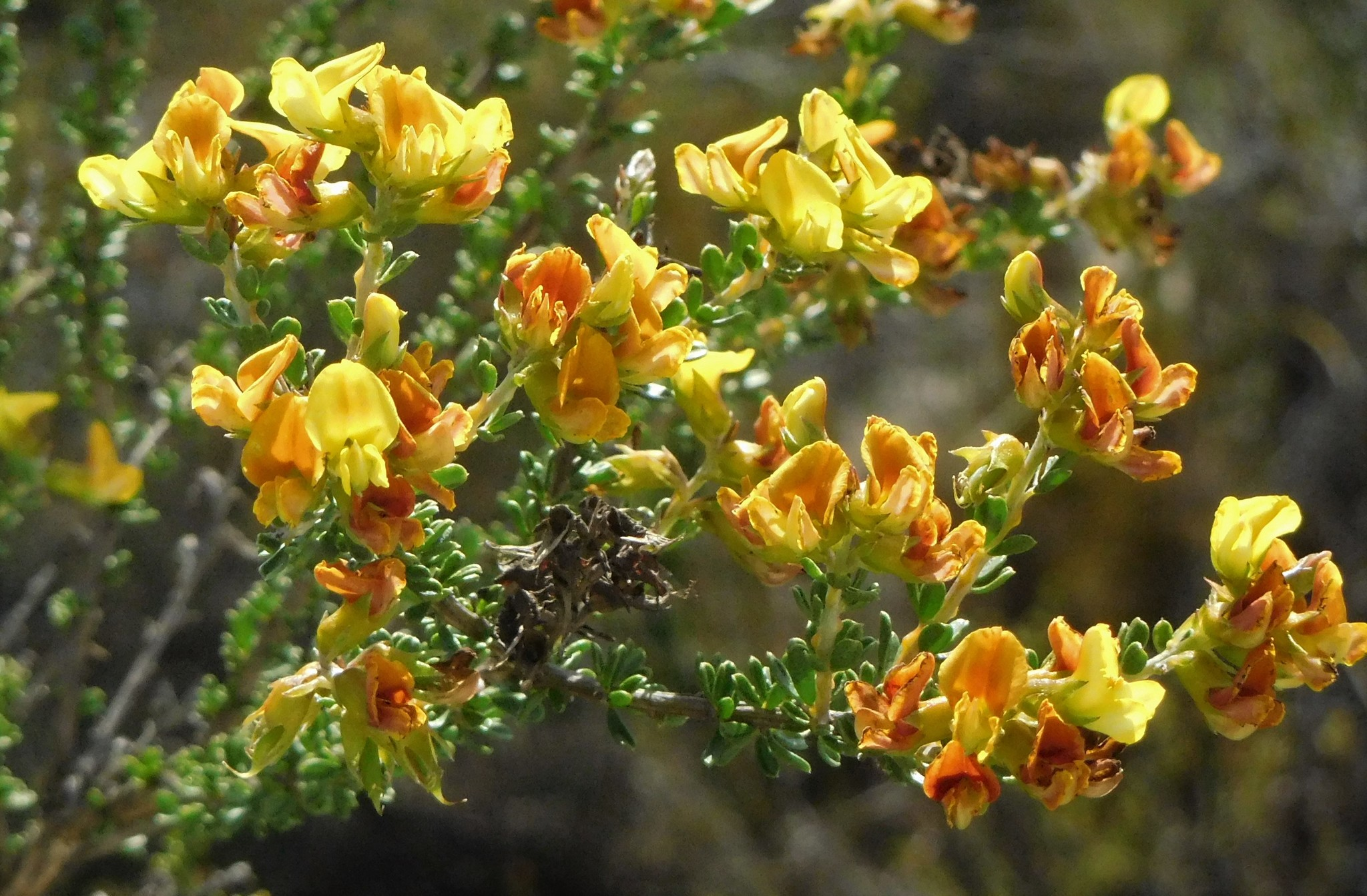
- Wiborgiella sessilifolia

Scientific classification
- Kingdom: Plantae
- Clade: Tracheophytes
- Clade: Angiosperms
- Clade: Eudicots
- Clade: Rosids
- Order: Fabales
- Family: Fabaceae
- Subfamily: Faboideae
- Tribe: Crotalarieae
- Genus: Wiborgiella; Boatwr. and B-E.Van Wyk

Type species
- Wiborgiella fasciculata (Benth.) Boatwr. and B-E.Van Wyk

Species
- See text

Synonyms
- Lebeckia section Viborgioides Benth.

= Wiborgiella =

Genus of legumes

Wiborgiella is a genus of flowering plants in the family Fabaceae. It belongs to the subfamily Faboideae.

They are native to the Cape Provinces and Free State (province) in South Africa.

The genus name of Wiborgiella is in honour of Erik Viborg (1759–1822), who was a Danish veterinarian and botanist.

== Species ==
Wiborgiella comprises the following species:

- Wiborgiella argentea Boatwr. & Helme
- Wiborgiella bowieana (Benth.) Boatwr. and B-E.Van Wyk
- Wiborgiella dahlgrenii Boatwr. & B.-E.van Wyk
- Wiborgiella fasciculata (Benth.) Boatwr. and B-E.Van Wyk
- Wiborgiella humilis (Thunb.) Boatwr. & B.-E. van Wyk
- Wiborgiella inflata (Bolus) Boatwr. and B-E.Van Wyk
- Wiborgiella leipoldtiana (Schltr. ex Dahlgr.) Boatwr. and B-E.Van Wyk
- Wiborgiella mucronata (Benth.) Boatwr. and B-E.Van Wyk
- Wiborgiella sessilifolia (Eckl. and Zeyh.) Boatwr. and B-E.Van Wyk
- Wiborgiella vlokii Boatwr. & B.-E.van Wyk
