= Richard Arnold Dümmer =

South African botanist (1887–1922)

Richard Arnold Dümmer

Richard Arnold Dümmer (1887 in Cape Town – 2 December 1922, in Uganda) was a South African botanist who collected in South Africa, Kenya and Uganda.

Dümmer worked at first in the Cape Town municipal gardens. Already at that time he issued the exsiccata-like specimen series Plantae Peninsulae Capensis. He joins Kew as a gardener in 1910. In 1911 he became assistant to Prof. Augustine Henry and had a hand in preparing Elwes and Henry's "The Trees of Great Britain and Ireland" for publication. Dümmer worked in the herbaria and libraries of Kew, the British Museum, the Linnaean Society, Cambridge, Oxford and Edinburgh Universities. He published taxonomic notes on Agathosma, Eugenia, Bruniaceae, Alepidea, Lotononis, Pleiospora, Combretaceae, Adenandra and Acmadenia.

He was employed by the Kivuvu Rubber Company of Kampala in 1914, using the opportunity to collect flowering plants and fungi. He also arranged botanical expeditions to Mount Elgon and Mount Longonot crater. Dümmer then spent a year back in Cape Town identifying and processing his collections.

His life and career were cut short by a motor-cycle accident on the Jinji road in Kampala. He is commemorated by the Kew Guild's annual award of "The Dümmer Memorial Prize" to the student submitting the best collection of British plants. His specimens number over 20 000 and are housed at PRE, SAM, NH, BM, E, K, MO, P and US.

The standard author abbreviation Dümmer is used to indicate this person as the author when citing a botanical name.
