= Gael Campbell-Young =

South African taxonomist and actor

- Born: Gael Jean Campbell; 1973 (age 52–53); Carletonville, Gauteng, South Africa
- Occupations: Project Manager; Actor
- Children: 2
- Scientific career
- Education: University of Johannesburg (MSc)
- Known for: Rafnia
- Fields: Plant Taxonomy
- Workplaces: University of the Witwatersrand, Curtin University, Monash University
- Website: Profile at RealPeople.com.au

Gael Jean Campbell-Young (née Campbell; born 1973, Carletonville) is a South African-born plant taxonomist and actor. She was actively involved in botanical research in South Africa until 2007, at which point she emigrated to Australia. Campbell-Young jointly discovered a new species of Pearsonia (Fabaceae) and the finding was published in 2008.

She continued her work in botanical research while pursuing a PhD at Curtin University and after a period of research management and academic teaching interspersed with a sabbatical in which she trained in the dramatic arts, she pivoted her career into Project management of biodiversity and land-use projects. Since March 2020 she has been employed as Project Officer - Short-Term Modular Housing Program for Bushfire Recovery Victoria, a division of the Victoria state government.

From 2013 Campbell-Young trained in acting, TV presentation and screenwriting. Subsequently, she has appeared in theatre productions, feature films, short films and television commercials, amongst other productions.

== Scientific education and career ==
Campbell-Young completed her BSc (Biological sciences) at the University of Johannesburg, South Africa in 1994, followed by a BSc(Honours) in Botany in 1995 and MSc (Plant Taxonomy) in 1998, for which she revised a genus of legumes endemic to the South African fynbos region called Rafnia.

In 1995 she worked as a freelance editor during which time she did technical editing and proof-reading of academic publications, PhD dissertations, technical reports and other similar documents.

Campbell-Young was appointed Botanical Research Officer / Biodiversity Consultant at the University of Johannesburg from October 1998 to November 2003. During this time she was involved in botanical taxonomy and research projects as well as biodiversity assessments for industrial development projects. She was one of three co-authors of a proposal presented to the International Association for Plant Taxonomy to conserve the name Spartium capense (Leguminosae), a name that was in use from at least the early 1800s. They were not successful.

From January 2005 to October 2007 Campbell-Young worked as Biodiversity Project Manager for conservation initiatives involving the Drakenstein municipality of Cape Town, the South African National Biodiversity Institute (SANBI) and the organisation "Friends of Paarl Mountain".

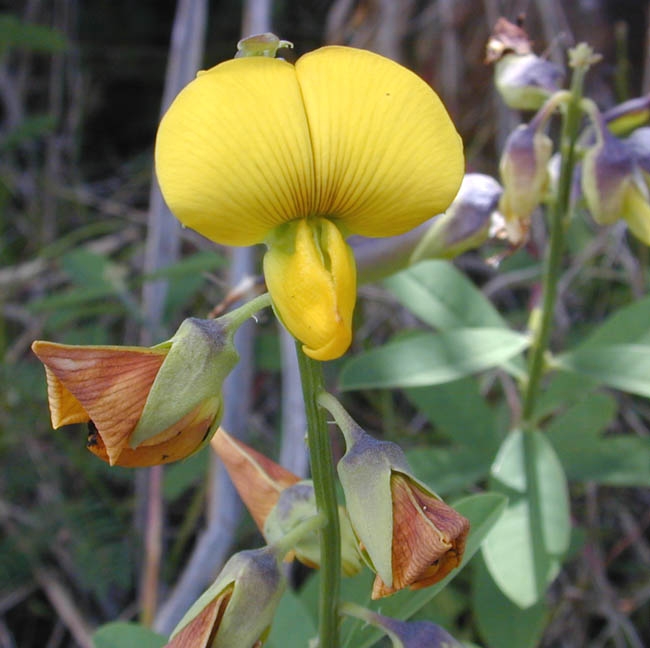
A member of Faboideae, Crotalaria retusa

In 2008, Campbell-Young and her colleague, Kevin Balkwill, jointly published the discovery of a new species belonging to the Faboideae subfamily, Pearsonia callistoma in the Nordic Journal of Botany and the discovery is jointly attributed to them in the botanical name. (The standard author abbreviation Campb.-Young is used to indicate this person as the author when citing a botanical name.)

Campbell-Young emigrated to Australia in 2007 and worked as Biodiversity Consultant for Ecological Associates (Pty) Ltd in Adelaide and editor of the Australian Systematic Botany Newsletter. In July 2010 she was appointed Vegetation Science Research Associate at Curtin University. She went on to pursue her PhD in Taxonomy at Curtin. Part of her research here included work for the Australian Research Council Linkage project. She stayed in this position until July 2013, at which time she left the university to pursue education in the dramatic arts. From August 2015 to June 2018 Campbell-Young returned to Curtin University and Monash University, where she had academic teaching duties.

At the end of July 2018, Campbell-Young briefly returned to South Africa to attend the Fynbos Forum in Rawsonville, Western Cape.

She was employed as Project officer from Sep 2018 for Policy and licensing at the Environmental Protection Authority in Victoria, Australia and from February 2019 for Vicamp Supply Review for the Department of Environment, Land, Water and Planning.

In 2019, Campbell-Young registered with the Australian Business Register as a sole trader and since March 2020 she has been the Project Leader for the Short-Term Modular Housing Program for Bushfire Recovery Victoria.

== Dramatic career ==
In 2013 and 2014 Campbell-Young attended several courses and workshops on Acting, TV presentation and Screenwriting, with additional courses up to 2016. Since 2013 she starred in 23 film productions, 4 television commercials, and 7 theatre productions (3 as lead).

Her theatre appearances include:

- 2016: Lead role in 'Night Mother
- 2015: Lead role in Deadly Relations
- 2014: Lead role in Love and Other Flushes

Her film appearances include:

- 2018 Neighbours
- 2018 Jack Irish
- 2016 Tainted Getaway
- 2015 To the End
- 2014 House of Hancock
- 2014 Dinner with Friends
- 2014 Three Idiots
- 2014 Infected Paradise
