= Leptis =

Leptis may refer to:

- Either of two cities of antiquity
  - Leptis Magna, Great Leptis, or simply Leptis, known as Lebda to modern-day residents of Libya, a prominent city of the Roman Empire
  - Leptis Parva, Leptis Minor, or Leptiminus, an ancient city on the Gulf of Hammamet along the eastern coast of Tunisia, near the modern city of Monastir
- Leptis, a synonym of the legume genus Lotononis
