= Leobordea mirabilis =

Conservation status
- Least Concern (IUCN 3.1)

Scientific classification
- Kingdom: Plantae
- Clade: Tracheophytes
- Clade: Angiosperms
- Clade: Eudicots
- Clade: Rosids
- Order: Fabales
- Family: Fabaceae
- Subfamily: Faboideae
- Genus: Leobordea
- Species: L. mirabilis

Binomial name
- Leobordea mirabilis (Dinter) B.-E.van Wyk & Boatwr.

Synonyms
- Amphinomia mirabilis (Dinter) A.Schreib. Lotononis mirabilis Dinter

Species of legume

Leobordea mirabilis is a known species of legume in the family Fabaceae. It is endemic to Namibia. Its natural habitat is rocky areas.

Originally assigned to the genus Lotononis, it was reassigned to Leobordea in 2011 when Lotonois was restructured.
