= Henry Harold Welch Pearson =

British-born South African botanist (1870–1916)

Henry Harold Welch Pearson FRS FLS
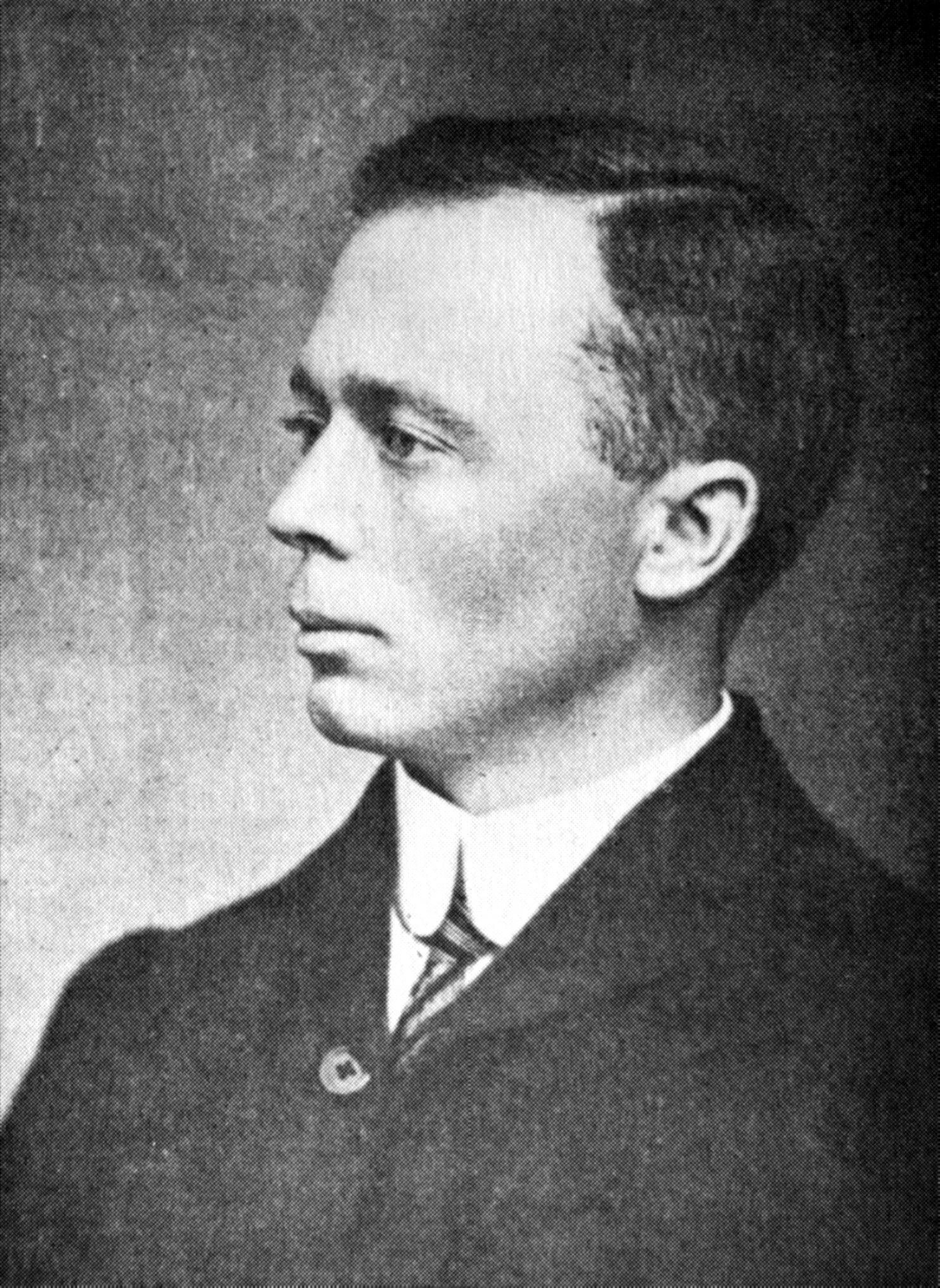
- Born: 28 January 1870; Long Sutton, Lincolnshire
- Died: 3 November 1916 (aged 46); Wynberg, Cape Town
- Resting place: Kirstenbosch National Botanical Garden
- Education: Christ's College, Cambridge
- Awards: Fellow of the Royal Society; Fellow of the Linnean Society of London
- Scientific career
- Fields: Botanist
- Workplaces: South African College
- Author abbrev. (botany): H.Pearson

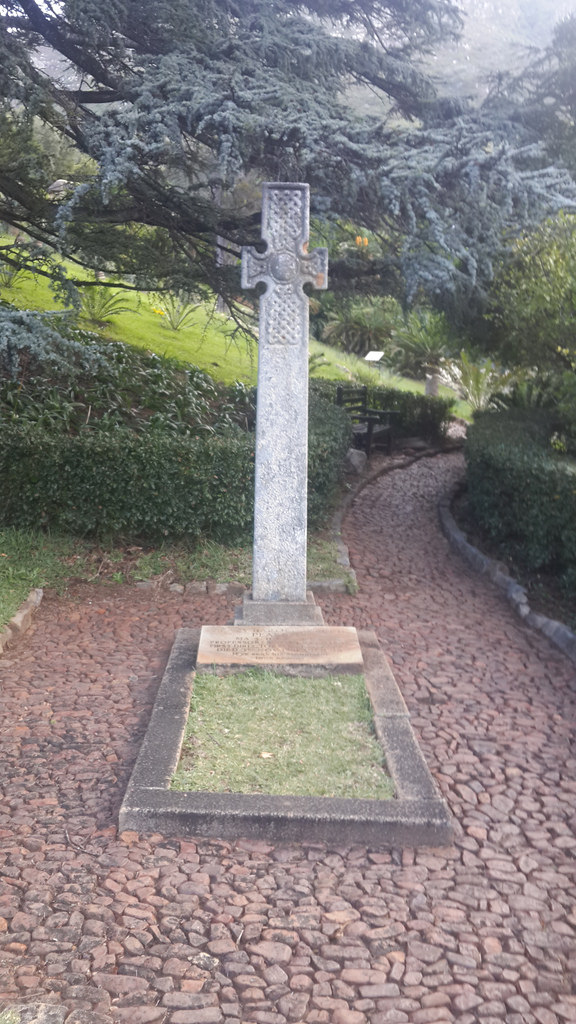
Henry Harold Welch Pearson – resting place. Kirstenbosch National Botanical Garden

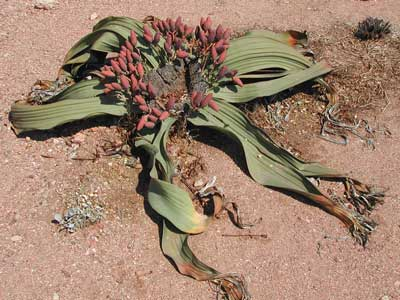
Welwitschia mirabilis – female plant

Henry Harold Welch Pearson (28 January 1870 – 3 November 1916) was a British-born South African botanist, chiefly remembered for founding Kirstenbosch National Botanical Garden in 1913.

== Biography ==
Pearson started his career as a chemist's assistant, but changed his interests after attending a lecture on plants by Albert Seward at Eastbourne in 1892. He taught for a while and was awarded a scholarship to Christ's College, Cambridge in 1896, obtaining a first class in the Natural Science Tripos.

Pearson published two papers in 1898, dealing with Bowenia spectabilis, a member of the Stangeriaceae from Australia. In the same year he explored the patanas (grassy uplands) in Ceylon for six months, having been awarded a Worts Travelling Scholars Fund. For this ecological dissertation he received the Walsingham Medal from Cambridge, the marine biologist Ernest William MacBride having been the first recipient in 1893. At Cambridge he was appointed Assistant Curator of the herbarium under Harry Marshall Ward. Here taxonomy engaged his interest and he received a Frank Smart Studentship. The following year found him at the Royal Botanic Gardens at Kew where he was Assistant for India. His interest in Verbenaceae led to his description of the family for Harvey & Sonder's Flora Capensis.

In 1903 Pearson became the first Harry Bolus Professor of Botany at the South African College. In 1904 he set off for South West Africa on the first of several expeditions with the object of studying the monotypic Welwitschia. This expedition was cut short by the first of the so-called Herero Wars. In 1907 he made a second attempt in the company of E. E. Galpin who had previously accompanied him on cycad-hunting trips to the Eastern Cape. His papers on the ecology, morphology and embryology of Welwitschia, led to a Cantabrigian DSc in 1907, which in turn led to a study of the closely related Gnetum, to which end he went on a collecting expedition to Angola in 1909. During this time he wrote an account of the Thymelaeaceae for the Flora of Tropical Africa.

Living in Cape Town and keenly aware of the floristic wealth of the Cape Peninsula, Pearson had become an ardent campaigner for the establishing of a botanical garden. He made an impassioned appeal to the authorities and the public at his 1910 presidential address to the South African Association for the Advancement of Science. As a consequence the Botanical Society of South Africa was formed in 1912 and a deputation was despatched to make representations to the Prime Minister, Louis Botha. The campaign found a powerful supporter in Sir Lionel Phillips, who introduced the necessary bill in the House of Assembly in 1913. An area which Cecil Rhodes had bequeathed to the public, was set aside and Kirstenbosch National Botanical Garden came into being. Pearson was appointed as the first director, with J. W. Matthews as curator.

On Pearson's death he was buried in Kirstenbosch, his epitaph reading "If ye seek his monument, look around". He is commemorated in the genus Pearsonia and several specific epithets. The 1914 volume 140 of Curtis's Botanical Magazine is dedicated to his memory. The Harold Pearson Chair of Botany at the University of Cape Town was founded in his honour, and the HW Pearson Building (home of the Botany Department) is named after him. This botanist is denoted by the author abbreviation H.Pearson when citing a botanical name.

== Honours, degrees and achievements ==
Bachelor of Arts Cantab. 1896, DSc 1907, Fellow of the Royal Society 1916, Fellow of the Linnean Society of London 1901, Assistant Curator Cambridge Herbarium 1898–99, Kew Herbarium 1899, Professor of Botany at South African College in Cape Town 1903, Director of Cape Botanical Gardens 1913.
