= Bolusia =

Scientific classification
- Kingdom: Plantae
- Clade: Tracheophytes
- Clade: Angiosperms
- Clade: Eudicots
- Clade: Rosids
- Order: Fabales
- Family: Fabaceae
- Subfamily: Faboideae
- Tribe: Crotalarieae
- Genus: Bolusia; Benth. (1873)

Species
- Bolusia acuminata (DC.) Polhill; Bolusia amboensis (Schinz) Harms; Bolusia ervoides (Welw. ex Baker) Torre; Bolusia grandis B.-E. Van Wyk; Bolusia polhilliana Lisowski; Bolusia resupinata Milne-Redh.
- Bolusia acuminata Bolusia ervoides Bolusia amboensis Bolusia resupinata Bolusia grandis An undescribed species of Bolusia

Genus of legumes

Bolusia is a genus of flowering plants in the family Fabaceae. It belongs to the subfamily Faboideae. It includes six species native to southern Africa.

- Bolusia acuminata (DC.) Polhill – southeastern Botswana to northern Cape Province of South Africa
- Bolusia amboensis (Schinz) Harms – southern Democratic Republic of the Congo through Angola, Zambia, Malawi, Zimbabwe, Namibia, and Botswana
- Bolusia ervoides (Welw. ex Baker) Torre – Angola (Huíla)
- Bolusia grandis B.-E. Van Wyk – southern Democratic Republic of the Congo and Zambia
- Bolusia polhilliana Lisowski – southern Democratic Republic of the Congo
- Bolusia resupinata Milne-Redh. – Malawi and Zambia
