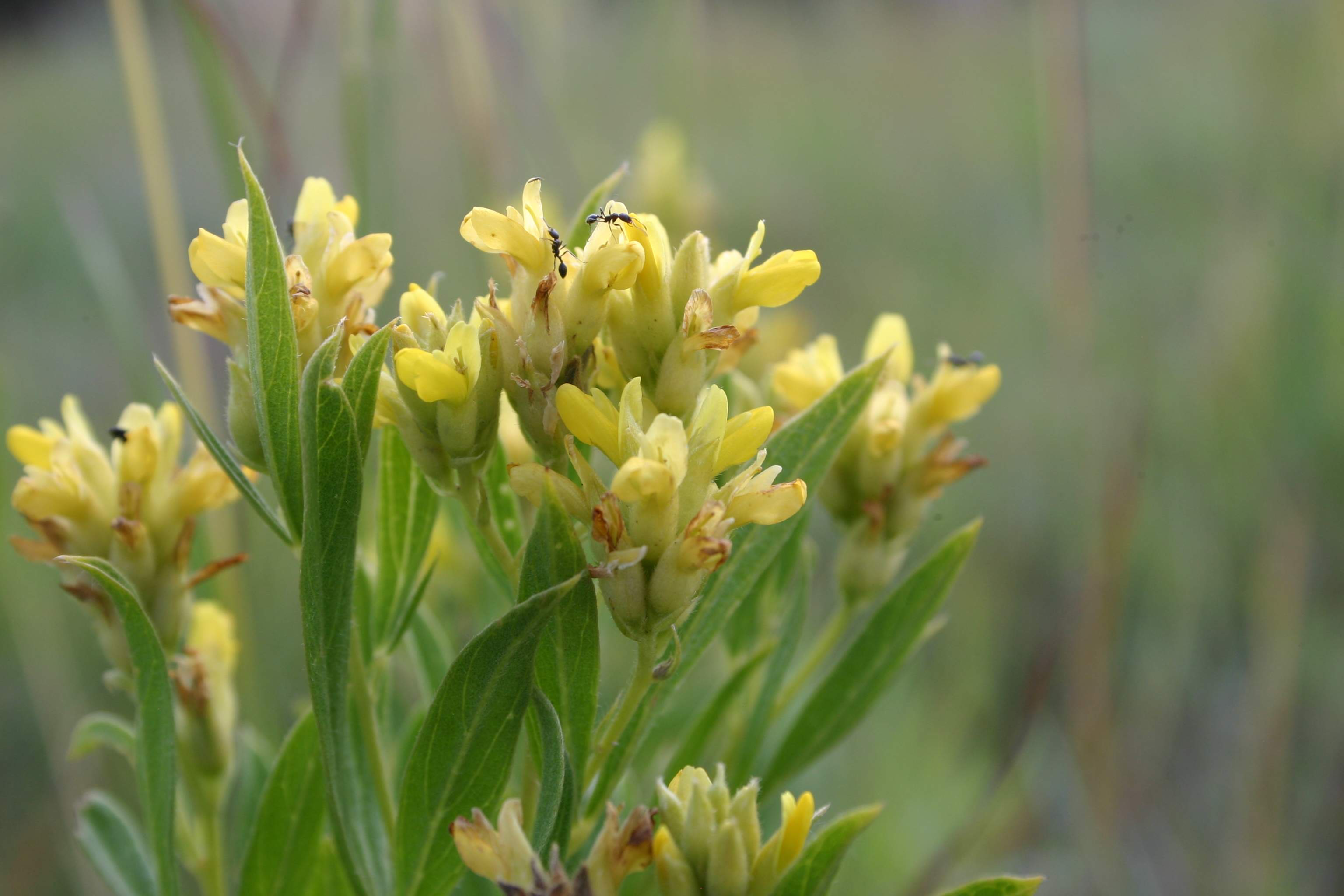

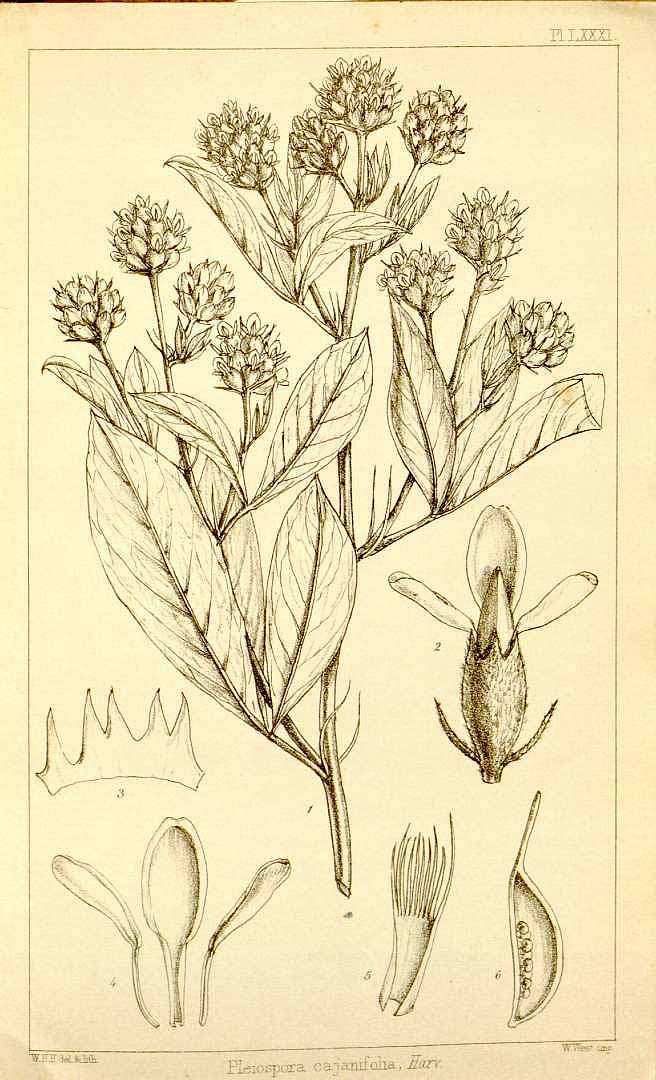
- Plate from William Henry Harvey's "Thesaurus capensis" (1859)

Scientific classification
- Kingdom: Plantae
- Clade: Tracheophytes
- Clade: Angiosperms
- Clade: Eudicots
- Clade: Rosids
- Order: Fabales
- Family: Fabaceae
- Subfamily: Faboideae
- Genus: Pearsonia
- Species: P. cajanifolia

Binomial name
- Pearsonia cajanifolia (Harv.) Polhill

Synonyms
- Pearsonia cajanifolia subsp. cajanifolia; Phaenohoffmannia cajanifolia (Harv.) Kuntze; Pleiospora cajanifolia Harv.; Pleiospora gracilior Dümmer

= Pearsonia cajanifolia =

Species of legume

Pearsonia cajanifolia is a South African shrublet belonging to the family of Fabaceae, and one of 13 species in the genus, usually herbs or shrublets with woody rootstocks and all occurring in Africa south of the equator with the exception of 1 species found on Madagascar. P. cajanifolia is commonly found in submontane grassland, at altitudes 1350–2100 m, in the South African provinces of Free State, Gauteng, Limpopo, Mpumalanga, and North West, also in Zimbabwe and Malawi.

== Description ==
Stems erect, well branched, (0.2)0.4–0.7(1.5) m tall, several from a deep taproot, pubescent to tomentose. Leaves mostly 3-foliolate, but upper ones 1-foliolate and intergrading to bracts; leaflets 3–6.5(9) × 0.8–2.5(3) cm, oblanceolate to elliptic or obovate, apiculate, thinly pubescent to silvery sericeous-tomentose; lower lateral nerves steeply ascending, reticulation rather prominent; petiole 0.5–2.8 cm long; stipules 0.4–1(1.4) cm long, linear-subulate. Flowers yellow, (3)8–30(40) in heads or short dense racemes often aggregated into panicles by suppression of upper leaves; bracts subtending flowers 4–8 mm long, linear or linear-lanceolate; bracteoles on the very short pedicels a little smaller. Calyx 6–10 mm long, tomentose; upper lip c. 1–1.5 times as long as the tube, with the lateral sinuses as high as or higher than the upper sinus; upper lobes 2–4 mm long, narrowly to broadly triangular-acuminate. Standard 8–13 × 3–7 mm, usually elliptic-oblong, pubescent outside. Stamens all joined. Ovary 6–12-ovulate. Pod little exserted from the calyx, 6–8 × 3–4 mm, oblong-ellipsoid, pubescent, usually only 2-seeded. Seeds c. 1 mm long, oblique-cordiform.

— Flora Zambesiaca volume:3 part:7

== Gallery ==
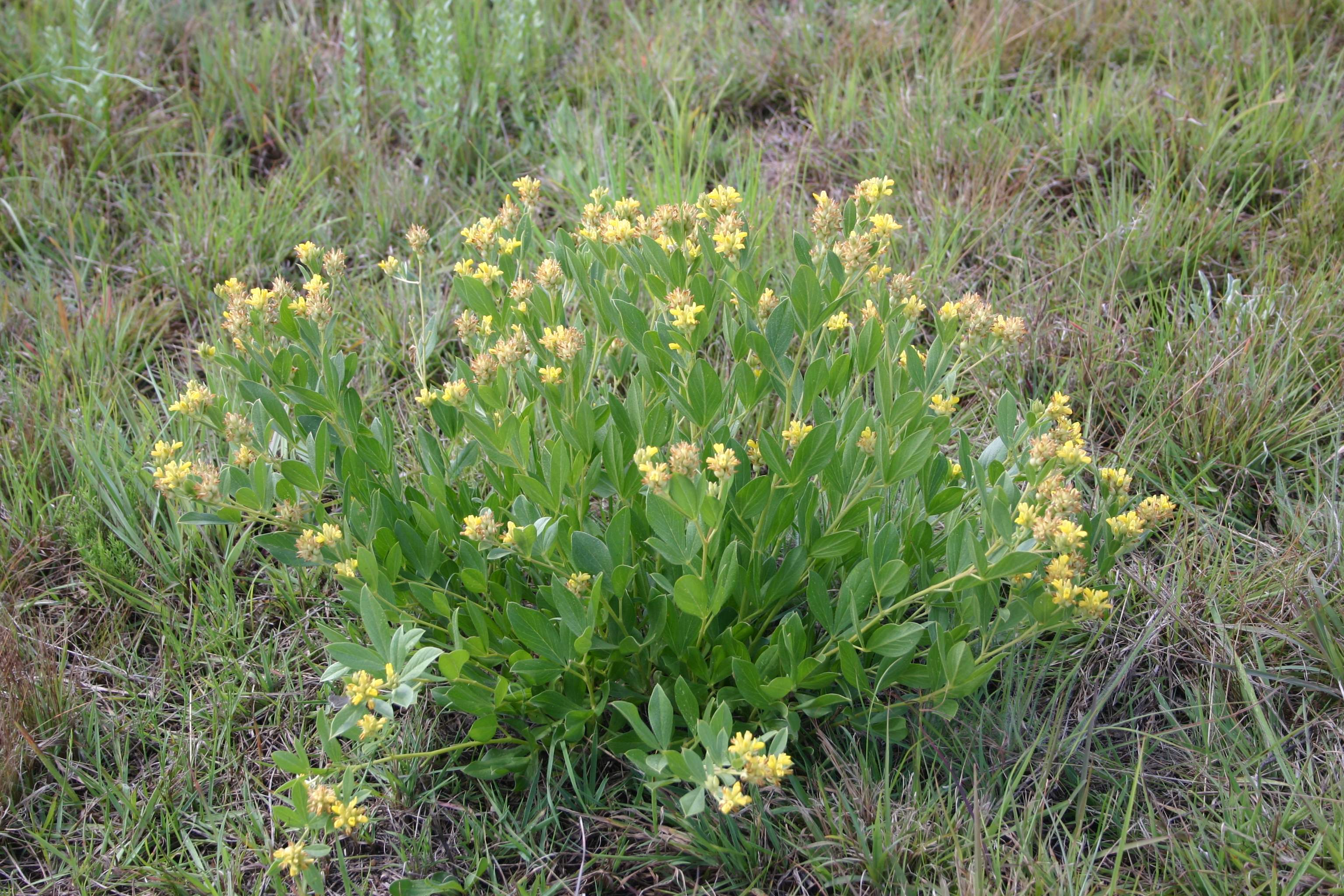
