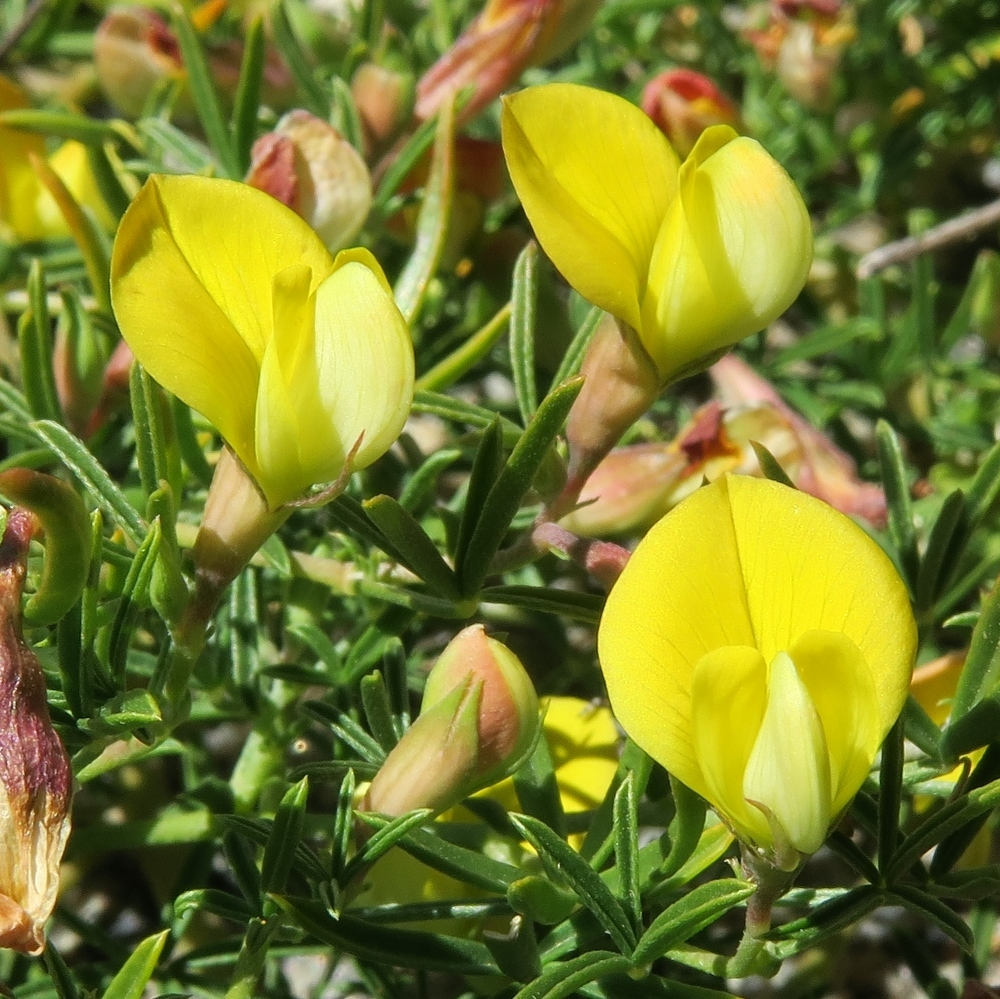
- Leobordea digitata

Scientific classification
- Kingdom: Plantae
- Clade: Tracheophytes
- Clade: Angiosperms
- Clade: Eudicots
- Clade: Rosids
- Order: Fabales
- Family: Fabaceae
- Subfamily: Faboideae
- Tribe: Crotalarieae
- Genus: Leobordea; Del., 1830

Type species
- Leobordea lotoidea Del., 1830

Species
- See text

Synonyms
- Leptis E. Mey. ex Eckl. & Zeyh. 1836; Lipozygis E. Mey. 1836; Lotononis sect. Leptis (E. Mey. ex Eckl. & Zeyh.) Benth.; Lotononis sect. Lipozygis (E. Mey.) Benth.; Lotononis sect. Synclistis B.-E. van Wyk 1991

= Leobordea =

Genus of legumes

Leobordea is a genus of legumes in the family Fabaceae and the tribe Crotalarieae. Members of this genus are found in the eastern parts of South Africa as well as tropical Africa and the Mediterranean countries. It was recently segregated from the genus Lotononis.

== Species ==
=== Section Digitata ===
- Leobordea benthamiana (Dümmer) B.-E. van Wyk & Boatwr.
- Leobordea digitata (Harv.) B.-E. van Wyk & Boatwr.
- Leobordea longiflora (H. Bolus) B.-E. van Wyk & Boatwr.
- Leobordea magnifica (B.-E. van Wyk) B.-E. van Wyk & Boatwr.
- Leobordea plicata (B.-E. van Wyk) B.-E. van Wyk & Boatwr.
- Leobordea quinata (Thunb.) B.-E. van Wyk & Boatwr.

=== Section Leobordea ===
- Leobordea bracteosa (B.-E. van Wyk) B.-E. van Wyk & Boatwr.
- Leobordea furcata (Merxmüller & Schreiber) B.-E. van Wyk & Boatwr.
- Leobordea newtonii (Dümmer) B.-E. van Wyk & Boatwr.
- Leobordea platycarpa (Viv.) B.-E. van Wyk & Boatwr.
- Leobordea schoenfelderi (Dinter ex Merxmüller & Schreiber) B.-E. van Wyk & Boatwr.
- Leobordea stipulosa (Bak. f.) B.-E. van Wyk & Boatwr.

=== Section Leptis ===
- Leobordea acuticarpa (B.-E. van Wyk) B.-E. van Wyk & Boatwr.
- Leobordea adpressa (N.E.Br.) B.-E. van Wyk & Boatwr.
  - subsp. adpressa (N.E.Br.) B.-E. van Wyk & Boatwr.
  - subsp. leptantha (B.-E. van Wyk) B.-E. van Wyk
- Leobordea arida (Dümmer) B.-E. van Wyk & Boatwr.
- Leobordea bullonii (Emberger & Maire) B.-E. van Wyk & Boatwr.
- Leobordea carinata (E.Mey.) B.-E. van Wyk & Boatwr.
- Leobordea decumbens (Thunb.) B.-E. van Wyk & Boatwr.
  - subsp. decumbens (Thunb.) B.-E. van Wyk & Boatwr.
  - subsp. rehmannii (Dümmer) B.-E. van Wyk & Boatwr.
- Leobordea divaricata Eckl. & Zeyh.
- Leobordea esterhuyseana (B.-E. van Wyk) B.-E. van Wyk & Boatwr.
- Leobordea genistoides Fenzl.
- Leobordea hirsuta (Schinz) B.-E. van Wyk & Boatwr.
- Leobordea lupinifolia Boiss.
- Leobordea maroccana (Ball) B.-E. van Wyk & Boatwr.
- Leobordea mirabilis (Dinter) B.-E. van Wyk & Boatwr.
- Leobordea mollis (E. Mey.) B.-E. van Wyk & Boatwr.
- Leobordea mucronata (Conrath) B.-E. van Wyk & Boatwr.
- Leobordea pariflora (N.E. Br.) B.-E. van Wyk & Boatwr.
- Leobordea prolifera (E. Mey.) Eckl. & Zeyh.
- Leobordea pusilla (Dümmer) B.-E. van Wyk & Boatwr.
- Leobordea stolzii (Harms) B.-E. van Wyk & Boatwr.
- Leobordea tapetiformis (Emberger & Maire) B.-E. van Wyk & Boatwr.

=== Section Lipozygis ===
==== Subsection Bracteolata ====
- Leobordea difformis (B.-E. van Wyk) B.-E. van Wyk & Boatwr.
- Leobordea procumbens (H. Bolus) B.-E. van W yk & Boatwr.

==== Subsection Lipozygis ====
- Leobordea corymbosa (E. Mey.) B.-E. van W yk & Boatwr.
- Leobordea eriantha (Benth.) B.-E. van W yk & Boatwr.
- Leobordea foliosa (H. Bolus) B.-E. van W yk & Boatwr.
- Leobordea grandis (Dümmer & Jennings) B.-E. van W yk & Boatwr.
- Leobordea lanceolata (E. Mey.) B.-E. van W yk & Boatwr.
- Leobordea pulchra (Dummer) B.-E. van W yk & Boatwr.
- Leobordea spicata (Compton) B.-E. van W yk & Boatwr.
- Leobordea sutherlandii (Dümmer) B.-E. van W yk & Boatwr.

=== Section Synclistus ===
- Leobordea anthylloides (Harv.) B.-E. van Wyk & Boatwr.
- Leobordea diffusa (Thunb.) B.-E. van Wyk & Boatwr.
- Leobordea globulosa (B.-E. van Wyk) B.-E. van Wyk & Boatwr.
- Leobordea lanata (Thunb.) B.-E. van Wyk & Boatwr.
- Leobordea laticeps (B.-E. van Wyk) B.-E. van Wyk & Boatwr.
- Leobordea longicephala (B.-E. van Wyk) B.-E. van Wyk & Boatwr.
- Leobordea oligocephala (B.-E. van Wyk) B.-E. van Wyk & Boatwr.
- Leobordea pentaphylla (E. Mey.) B.-E. van Wyk & Boatwr.
- Leobordea polycephala (E. Mey.) B.-E. van Wyk & Boatwr.
