= Lotononis pachycarpa =

Conservation status
- Least Concern (IUCN 3.1)

Scientific classification
- Kingdom: Plantae
- Clade: Tracheophytes
- Clade: Angiosperms
- Clade: Eudicots
- Clade: Rosids
- Order: Fabales
- Family: Fabaceae
- Subfamily: Faboideae
- Genus: Lotononis
- Species: L. pachycarpa

Binomial name
- Lotononis pachycarpa Dinter ex B.-E. van Wyk

Species of legume

Lotononis pachycarpa is a species of flowering plant in the family Fabaceae. It is found only in Namibia. Its natural habitat is cold desert.
