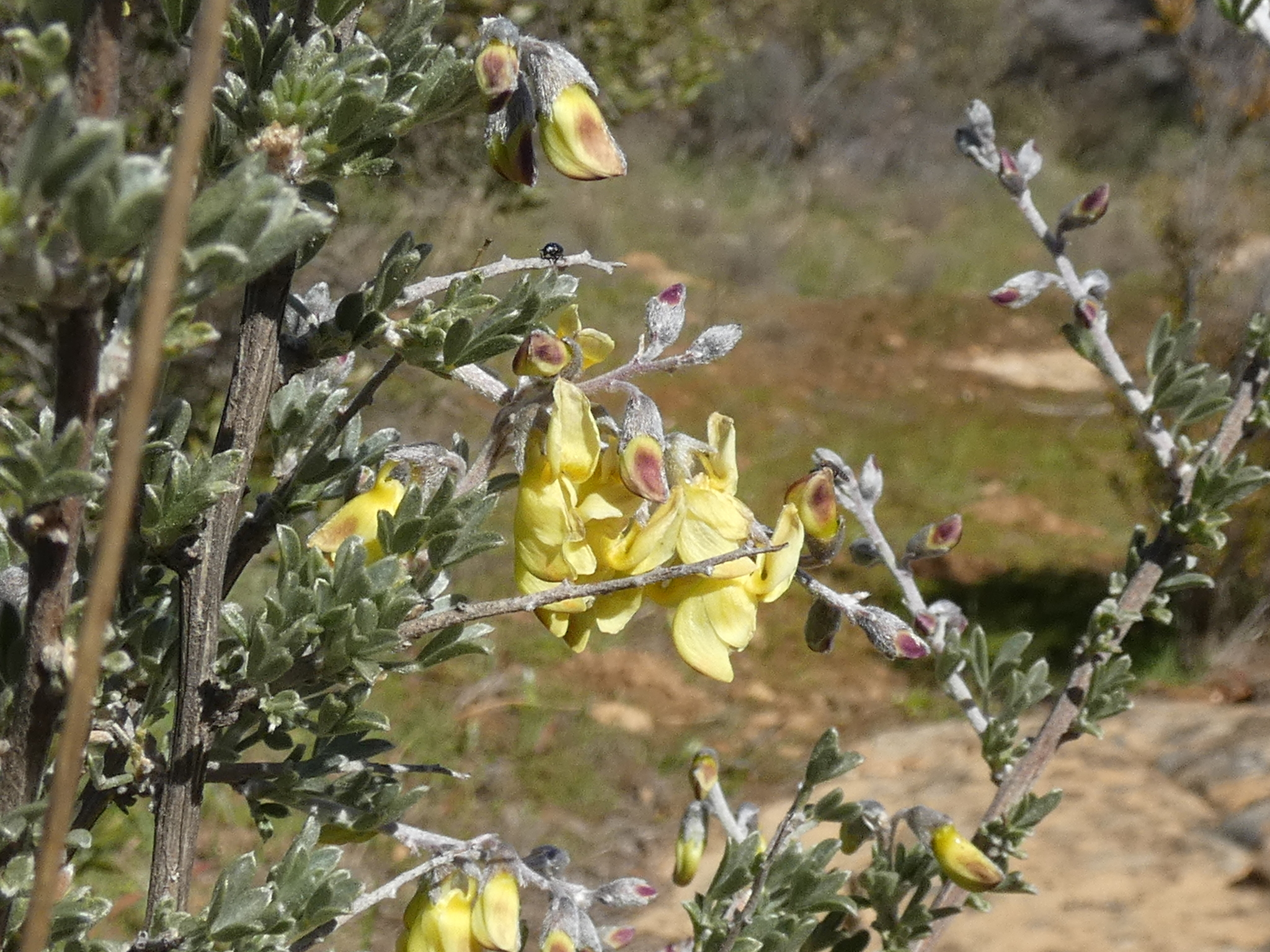
- Wiborgia monoptera

Scientific classification
- Kingdom: Plantae
- Clade: Tracheophytes
- Clade: Angiosperms
- Clade: Eudicots
- Clade: Rosids
- Order: Fabales
- Family: Fabaceae
- Subfamily: Faboideae
- Tribe: Crotalarieae
- Genus: Wiborgia; Thunb. (1800), nom. cons.

Species
- Wiborgia fusca Thunb.; Wiborgia incurvata E. Mey.; Wiborgia leptoptera R. Dahlgren; Wiborgia monoptera E. Mey.; Wiborgia mucronata (L. f.) Druce; Wiborgia obcordata (P.J. Bergius) Thunb.; Wiborgia sericea Thunb.; Wiborgia tenuifolia E. Mey.; Wiborgia tetraptera E. Mey.

Synonyms
- Jacksonago Kuntze in Revis. Gen. Pl. 1: 191 (1891) Loethainia Heynh. in Nom. Bot. Hort.: 883 (1841) Peltaria Burm. ex DC. in Prodr. 2: 420 (1825), pro syn.

= Wiborgia =

Genus of legumes

Wiborgia is a genus of plants in the legume family, Fabaceae. It includes nine species of shrubs endemic to the Cape Provinces of South Africa. They grow in fynbos or renosterveld (Mediterranean-climate shrubland), mostly in sandy flats and rocky areas. The genus was named for Erik Viborg by Carl Peter Thunberg.
