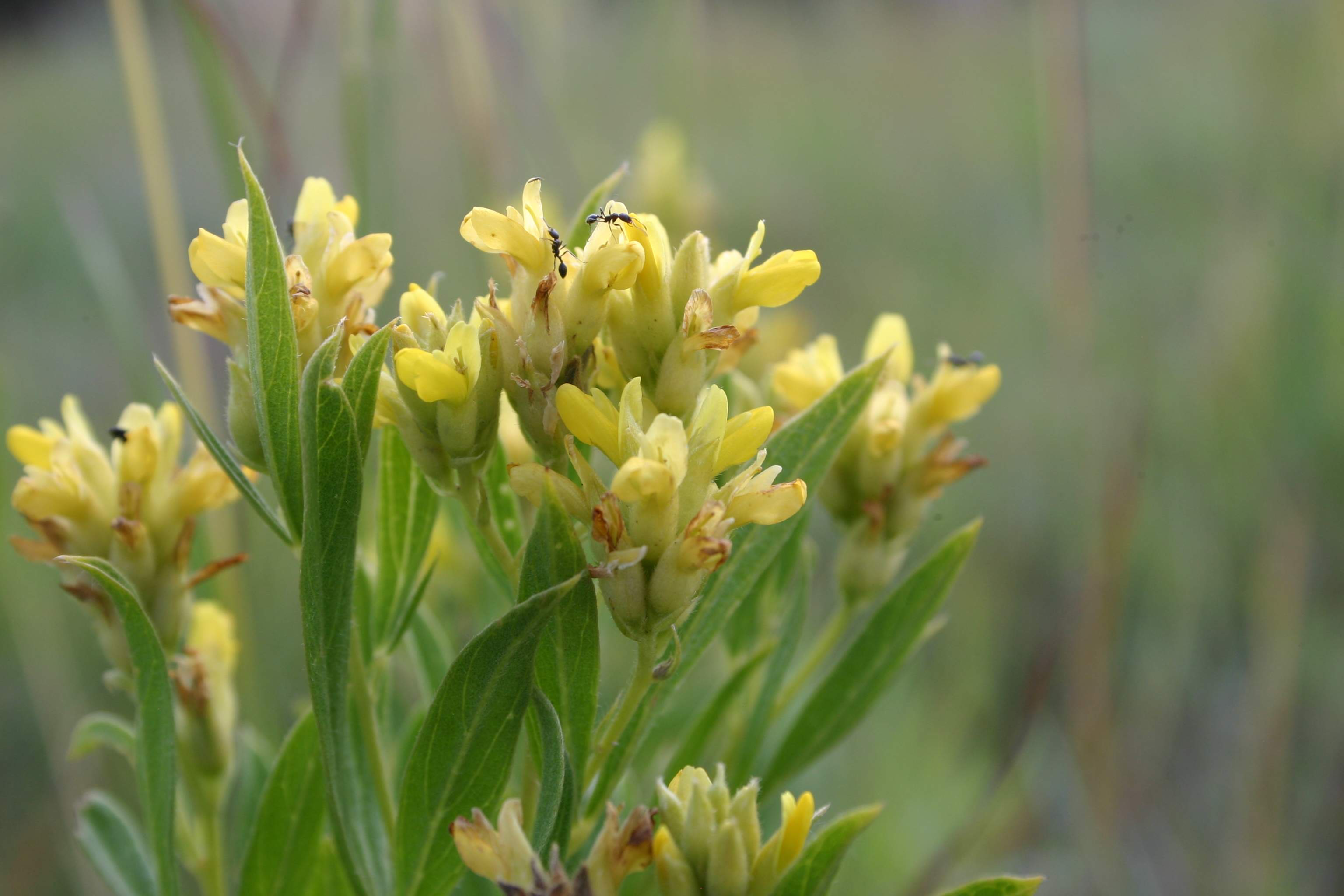
- Pearsonia cajanifolia

Scientific classification
- Kingdom: Plantae
- Clade: Tracheophytes
- Clade: Angiosperms
- Clade: Eudicots
- Clade: Rosids
- Order: Fabales
- Family: Fabaceae
- Subfamily: Faboideae
- Tribe: Crotalarieae
- Genus: Pearsonia; Dümmer (1912)

Species
- See text

Synonyms
- Edbakeria R.Vig. (1948 publ. 1949); Gamwellia Baker f. (1935); Phaenohoffmannia Kuntze (1891); Pleiospora Harv. (1859)

= Pearsonia =

Genus of legumes

Pearsonia is a genus of 12 species of plants belonging to the family Fabaceae and occurring in Africa south of the equator with 1 species found on Madagascar. The species are usually herbs or shrublets with woody rootstocks. Leaves are usually sessile and 3-foliolate. The inflorescence is a congested or lax terminal raceme. The name of this genus commemorates the South African botanist Henry Harold Welch Pearson.

== Species ==
Pearsonia comprises the following species:

- Pearsonia aristata (Schinz) Dummer
- Pearsonia bracteata (Benth.) Polhill
- Pearsonia cajanifolia (Harv.) Polhill
  - subsp. cajanifolia (Harv.) Polhill
  - subsp. cryptantha (Baker) Polhill
- Pearsonia callistoma Campb.-Young & K.Balkwill
- Pearsonia flava (Baker f.) Polhill
- Pearsonia grandifolia (Bolus) Polhill
  - subsp. grandifolia (Bolus) Polhill
  - subsp. latibracteolata (Dummer) Polhill
- Pearsonia hirsuta Germish.
- Pearsonia madagascariensis (R. Vig.) Polhill
- Pearsonia mesopontica Polhill
- Pearsonia metallifera Wild
- Pearsonia obovata (Schinz) Polhill
- Pearsonia sessilifolia (Harv.) Dummer
  - subsp. filifolia (Bolus)Polhill
  - subsp. marginata (Schinz) Polhill
  - subsp. sessilifolia (Harv.) Dummer
- Pearsonia uniflora (Kensit) Polhill
