= Rothia (plant) =

Scientific classification
- Kingdom: Plantae
- Clade: Tracheophytes
- Clade: Angiosperms
- Clade: Eudicots
- Clade: Rosids
- Order: Fabales
- Family: Fabaceae
- Subfamily: Faboideae
- Tribe: Crotalarieae
- Genus: Rothia; Pers. (1807), nom. cons.

Species
- See text
- The range of Rothia: Rothia hirsuta; Rothia indica subsp. australis; Rothia indica subsp. indica

Synonyms
- Dillwynia Roth (1806), nom. illeg.; Goetzea Rchb. (1828); Harpelema J.Jacq. (1844); Westonia Spreng. (1826), nom. illeg.; Xerocarpus Guill. & Perr. (1832)

Genus of legumes

Rothia is a genus of flowering plants in the family Fabaceae. It belongs to the tribe Crotalarieae of subfamily Faboideae, and comprises two species:

- Rothia hirsuta (Guill. & Perr.) Baker – sub-Saharan Africa and Madagascar
- Rothia indica (L.) Druce – western and southern India, southeastern China, Laos and Vietnam, Peninsular Malaysia, and northern Australia
  - subsp. australis A.E.Holland
  - subsp. indica (L.) Druce
