= Leobordea adpressa =

Conservation status
- Least Concern (IUCN 3.1)

Scientific classification
- Kingdom: Plantae
- Clade: Tracheophytes
- Clade: Angiosperms
- Clade: Eudicots
- Clade: Rosids
- Order: Fabales
- Family: Fabaceae
- Subfamily: Faboideae
- Genus: Leobordea
- Species: L. adpressa

Binomial name
- Leobordea adpressa (N.E.Br.) B.-E. van Wyk & Boatwr.

Subspecies
- subsp. adpressa (N.E.Br.) B.-E. van Wyk & Boatwr.; subsp. leptantha (B.-E. van Wyk) B.-E. van Wyk

Synonyms
- Lotononis adpressa N.E.Br.

Species of plant

Leobordea adpressa is a species of flowering plant in the family Fabaceae. It is found in Lesotho and South Africa. Its natural habitat is temperate grassland.
