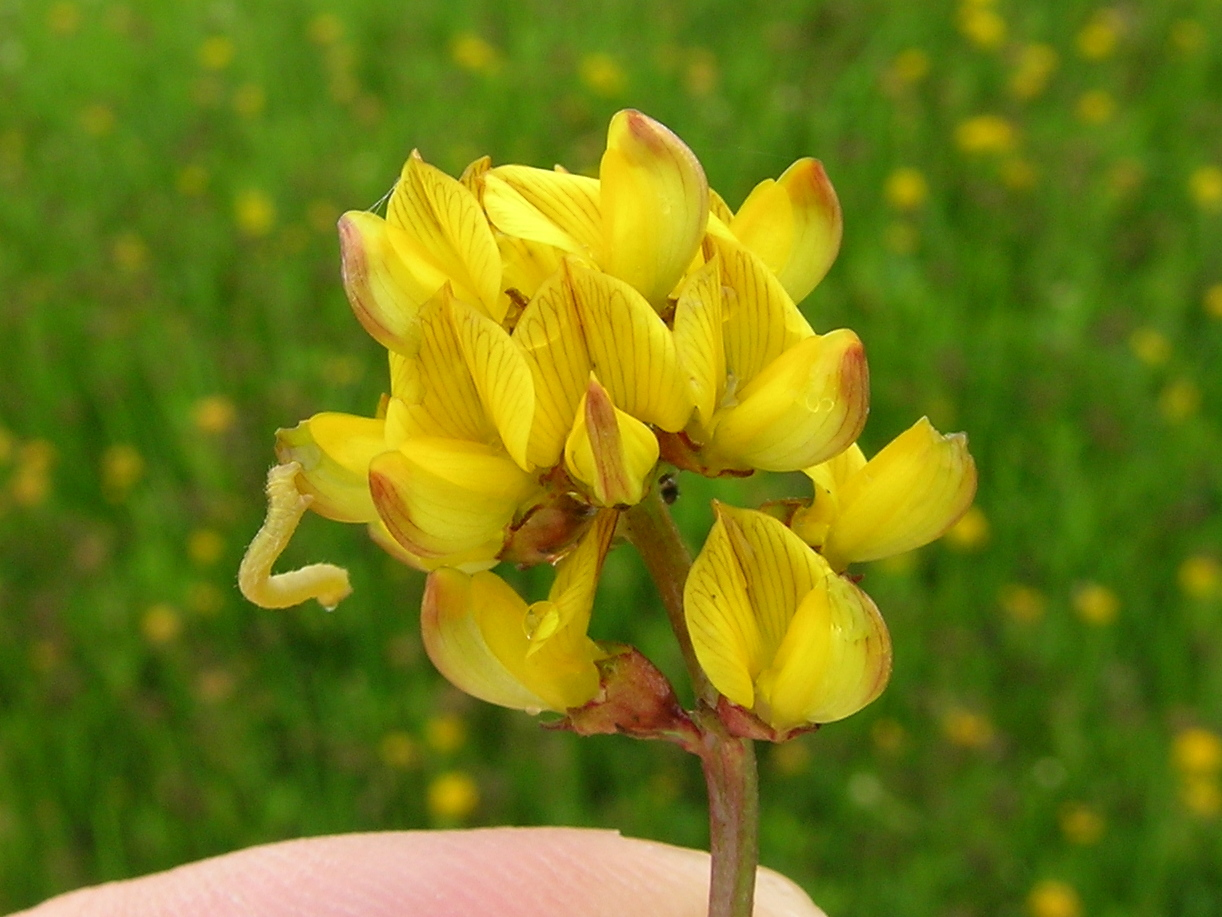
- Listia bainesii

Scientific classification
- Kingdom: Plantae
- Clade: Embryophytes
- Clade: Tracheophytes
- Clade: Spermatophytes
- Clade: Angiosperms
- Clade: Eudicots
- Clade: Rosids
- Order: Fabales
- Family: Fabaceae
- Subfamily: Faboideae
- Tribe: Crotalarieae
- Genus: Listia; E. Mey.

Type species
- Listia heterophylla E. Mey.

Species
- See text.

Synonyms
- Lotononis sect. Listia (E. Mey.) B.-E. van Wyk, 1991

= Listia (plant) =

Genus of legumes

Listia is a genus of flowering plants in the family Fabaceae and the tribe Crotalarieae. Members of this genus are mainly found in southern Africa but some species can be found in central Africa. It was recently segregated from the genus Lotononis. Unlike other members of the Crotalarieae, members of the genus Listia have lupinoid root nodules.

The genus name of Listia is in honour of Friedrich Ludwig List (1779-1837), who was a German botanist and teacher.

The genus was circumscribed by Ernst Heinrich Friedrich Meyer in Comm. Pl. Afr. Austr. (Meyer) page 80 in 1835.

== Species ==
As accepted by Kew:

- Listia angolensis (Welw. ex Bak.) B.-E. van Wyk & Boatwr.
- Listia bainesii (Bak.) B.-E. van Wyk & Boatwr.
- Listia heterophylla (E. Mey.) B.-E. van Wyk & Boatwr.
- Listia marlothii (Engl.) B.-E. van Wyk & Boatwr.
- Listia minima (B.-E. van Wyk) B.-E. van Wyk & Boatwr.
- Listia solitudinis (Dümmer) B.-E. van Wyk & Boatwr.
- Listia subulata (B.-E. van Wyk) B.-E. van Wyk & Boatwr.
