= Robynsiophyton =

Scientific classification
- Kingdom: Plantae
- Clade: Tracheophytes
- Clade: Angiosperms
- Clade: Eudicots
- Clade: Rosids
- Order: Fabales
- Family: Fabaceae
- Subfamily: Faboideae
- Tribe: Crotalarieae
- Genus: Robynsiophyton; R.Wilczek (1953)
- Species: R. vanderystii

Binomial name
- Robynsiophyton vanderystii R.Wilczek (1953)

Genus of legumes

Robynsiophyton vanderystii is a species of flowering plants in the family Fabaceae. It belongs to the subfamily Faboideae. It is the only member of the genus Robynsiophyton.

Robynsiophyton vanderystii is an herb native to southern tropical Africa, including portions of Republic of the Congo, Democratic Republic of the Congo, Angola, and Zambia. It grows in grassland in the transition zone between the equatorial Guineo-Congolian forest and the grasslands and savannas of the Zambezian region.
