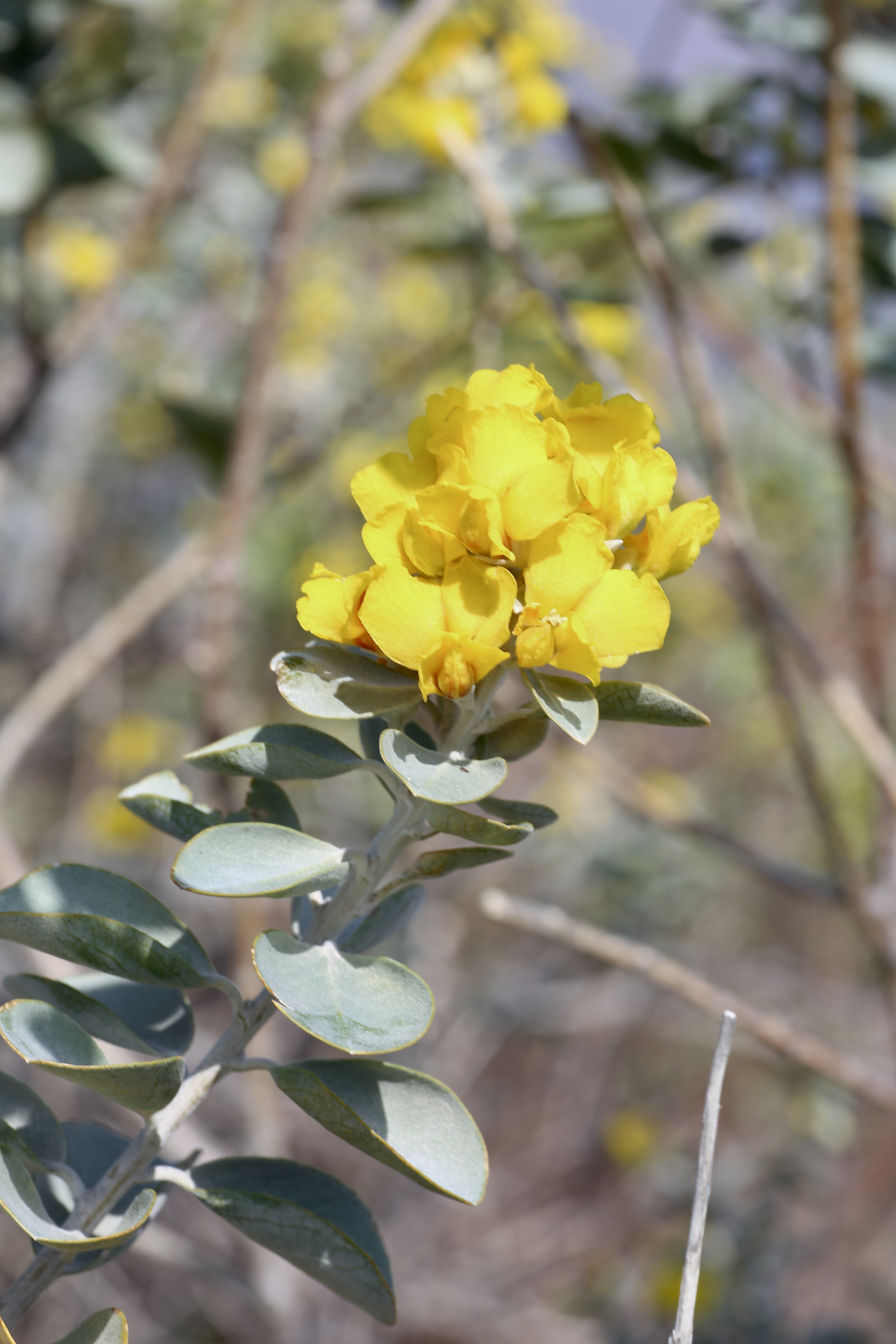
- Stirtonanthus taylorianus in Swartberg Pass, Western Cape, South Africa.

Scientific classification
- Kingdom: Plantae
- Clade: Tracheophytes
- Clade: Angiosperms
- Clade: Eudicots
- Clade: Rosids
- Order: Fabales
- Family: Fabaceae
- Subfamily: Faboideae
- Tribe: Podalyrieae
- Genus: Stirtonanthus; B.-E. van Wyk & A.L.Schutte (1995)

Species
- Stirtonanthus chrysanthus (Adamson) B.-E. van Wyk & A.L. Schutte; Stirtonanthus insignis (Compton) B.-E. van Wyk & A.L. Schutte; Stirtonanthus taylorianus (L. Bolus) B.-E. van Wyk & A.L. Schutte
- Stirtonanthus is endemic to South Africa.: Stirtonanthus chrysanthus; Stirtonanthus insignis; Stirtonanthus taylorianus

Synonyms
- Stirtonia B.-E.van Wyk & A.L.Schutte (1994), nom. illeg.

= Stirtonanthus =

Genus of legumes

Stirtonanthus is a South African genus of flowering plants in the family Fabaceae. It includes three species of shrubs native to the Cape Provinces of South Africa. They grow in fynbos (Mediterranean-climate shrubland) at medium to high elevations. Each species is highly localized. It belongs to subfamily Faboideae.
