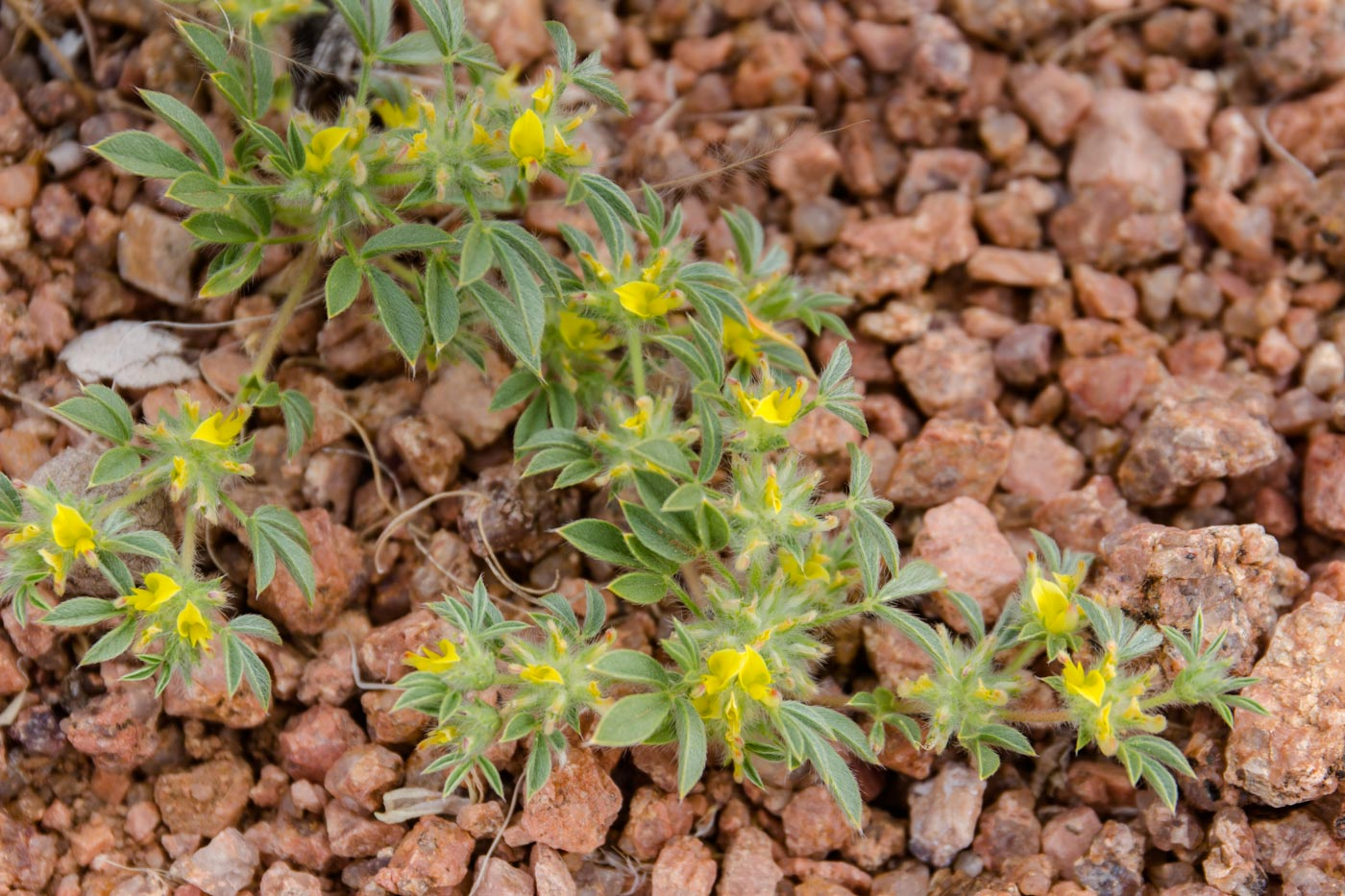

Scientific classification
- Kingdom: Plantae
- Clade: Tracheophytes
- Clade: Angiosperms
- Clade: Eudicots
- Clade: Rosids
- Order: Fabales
- Family: Fabaceae
- Subfamily: Faboideae
- Genus: Leobordea
- Species: L. platycarpa

Binomial name
- Leobordea platycarpa (Viv.) B.-E. van Wyk & Boatwr.

Synonyms
- Amphinomia dinteri (Schinz) A.Schreib; Amphinomia lotoidea (Delile) Maire; Amphinomia platycarpa (Viv.) Cufod.; Amphinomia steingroeveriana (Schinz) A.Schreib.; Capnitis clandestina E.Mey.; Capnitis porrecta E.Mey.; Leobordea abyssinica Hochst. ex A.Rich.; Leobordea lotoidea Delile; Leobordea persica Jaub. & Spach; Lotononis abyssinica (Hochst. ex A.Rich.) Kotschy; Lotononis carinalis Harv.; Lotononis clandestina (E.Mey.) Benth.; var. clandestina (E.Mey.) Benth.; var. steingroeveriana Schinz; Lotononis dichotoma (Delile) Boiss.; Lotononis dinteri Schinz; Lotononis leobordea Benth.; Lotononis lotoidea (Delile) Batt.; Lotononis persica (Jaub. & Spach) Boiss.; Lotononis platycarpa (Viv.) Pic.Serm.; Lotononis porrecta (E.Mey.) Benth.; Lotononis sphaerocarpa Boiss.; Lotononis steingroeveriana (Schinz) Dummer; Lotus dichotomus Delile ex Walp.; Lotus platycarpa Viv.; Lotus platycarpos Viv.

= Leobordea platycarpa =

Species of legume

Leobordea platycarpa is a common annual plant in the drier parts of the African continent found in open ground, roadsides, cultivated ground and other disturbed places or in short grassland on sand.

== Distribution ==
Recorded growing at altitudes of 900 metres (3,000 ft) to 1,400 metres (4,600 ft) L. playcarpa makes its home in open ground, roadsides, cultivated ground and other disturbed places or in short grassland on sand.

Native
Palearctic:

Macaronesia: Cape Verde
Northern Africa: Algeria, Egypt, Libya, Morocco

Afrotropic:

Northeast Tropical Africa: Chad, Djibouti, Ethiopia, Sudan
East Tropical Africa: Kenya, Tanzania, Uganda
West-Central Tropical Africa: Central African Republic, Zaire
South Tropical Africa: Angola, Zimbabwe
Southern Africa: Botswana, Namibia, South Africa - Cape Province, Free State, Transvaal
Western Indian Ocean: Mauritius
Arabian Peninsula: Oman, Qatar, Saudi Arabia, Yemen
Western Asia: Iran, Israel, Syria

Indomalaya:

Indian Subcontinent: Pakistan
