= Ezoloba =

Scientific classification
- Kingdom: Plantae
- Clade: Tracheophytes
- Clade: Angiosperms
- Clade: Eudicots
- Clade: Rosids
- Order: Fabales
- Family: Fabaceae
- Subfamily: Faboideae
- Tribe: Crotalarieae
- Genus: Ezoloba; B.-E. van Wyk & Boatwr. (2011)
- Species: E. macrocarpa

Binomial name
- Ezoloba macrocarpa (Eckl. & Zeyh.) B.-E. van Wyk & Boatwr. (2011)

Synonyms
- Lotononis macrocarpa Eckl. & Zeyh. (1836)

Genus of legumes

Ezoloba macrocarpa is a species of flowering plant in the family Fabaceae and the tribe Crotalarieae. It is a perennial plant endemic to the Cape Provinces of South Africa. It is the only species included in the genus Ezoloba.
