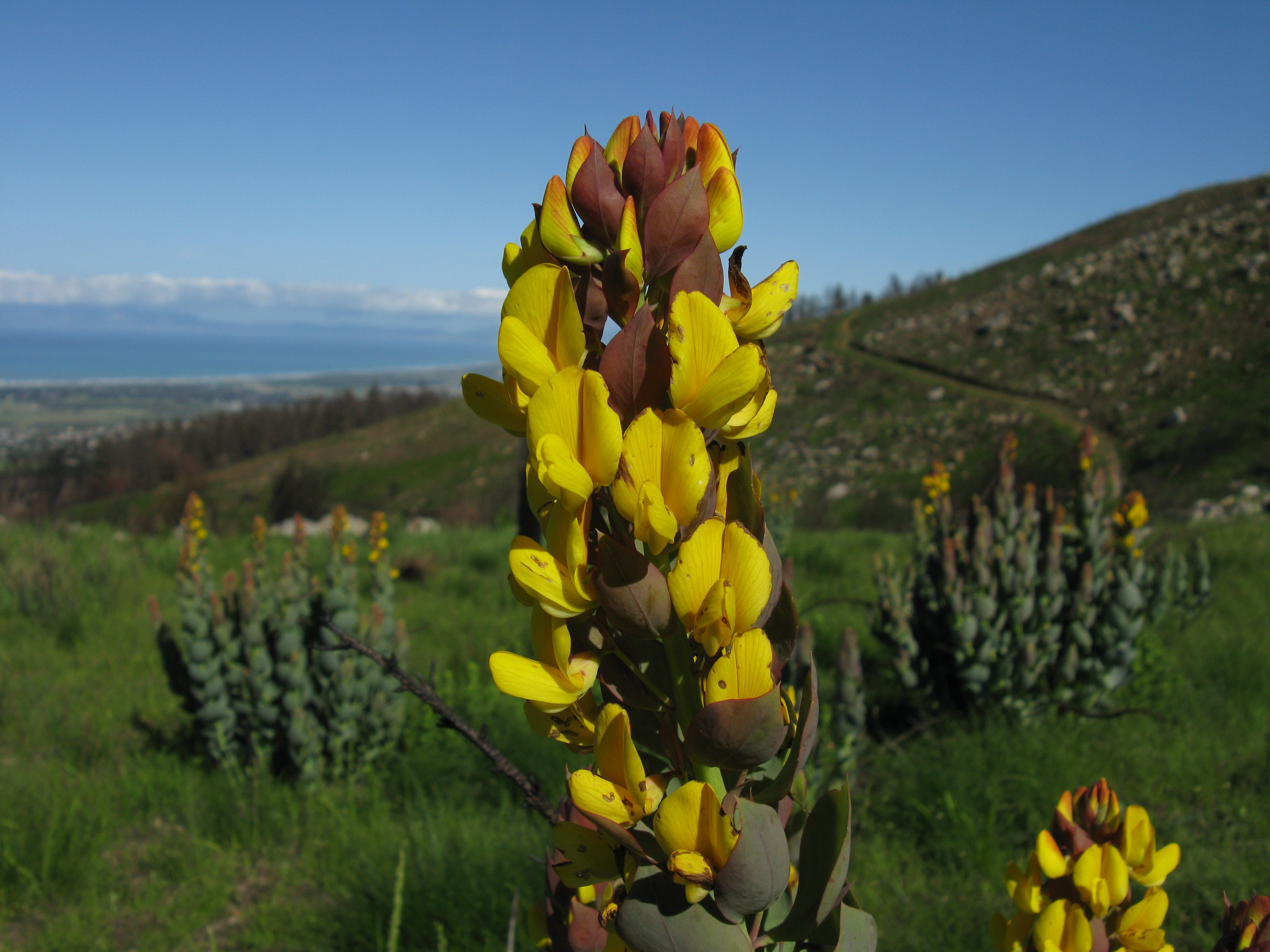
- Rafnia triflora

Scientific classification
- Kingdom: Plantae
- Clade: Embryophytes
- Clade: Tracheophytes
- Clade: Angiosperms
- Clade: Eudicots
- Clade: Rosids
- Order: Fabales
- Family: Fabaceae
- Subfamily: Faboideae
- Tribe: Crotalarieae
- Genus: Rafnia; Thunb. (1800)

Species
- 29; see text

Synonyms
- Oedmannia Thunb. (1800); Pelecynthis E.Mey. (1836); Vascoa DC. (1826)

= Rafnia =

Genus of legumes

Rafnia is a genus of flowering plants in the family Fabaceae. It includes 29 species of shrubs and subshrubs native to South Africa. They grow in Mediterranean-climate fynbos (shrubland) and grassland, mostly on rocky and sandy soils. Most are native to the Cape Provinces, with some extending eastwards into KwaZulu-Natal. It belongs to subfamily Faboideae.

== Species ==
Rafnia comprises the following species:

- Rafnia acuminata (E. Mey.) G. J. Campbell & B.-E. van Wyk
- Rafnia affinis Harv.
- Rafnia alata G.J.Campb. & B.-E.van Wyk
- Rafnia amplexicaulis Thunb.
- Rafnia angulata Thunb.
- Rafnia axillaris Thunb.
- Rafnia capensis (L.) Schinz
  - subsp. calycina G. J. Campbell & B.-E. van Wyk
  - subsp. capensis (L.) Druce
  - subsp. carinata G. J. Campbell & B.-E. van Wyk
  - subsp. dichotoma (Eckl. & Zeyh.) G. J. Campbell & B.-E. van Wyk
  - subsp. elsieae G. J. Campbell & B.-E. van Wyk
  - subsp. ovata (P. J. Bergius) G. J. Campbell & B.-E. van Wyk
  - subsp. pedicellata G. J. Campbell & B.-E. van Wyk
- Rafnia crassifolia Harv.
- Rafnia crispa C.H. Stirt.
- Rafnia cuneifolia Thunb.
- Rafnia diffusa Thunb.
- Rafnia ecklonis E.Mey.
- Rafnia elliptica Thunb.
- Rafnia erecta Thunb.
- Rafnia gibba (E.Mey.) Druce
- Rafnia globosa G.J.Campb. & B.-E.van Wyk
- Rafnia inaequalis G.J.Campb. & B.-E.van Wyk
- Rafnia lancea DC.
- Rafnia lebeckioides Boatwr. & B.-E.van Wyk
- Rafnia opposita Thunb.
- Rafnia ovata E.Mey.
- Rafnia racemosa Eckl. & Zeyh.
- Rafnia retroflexa Thunb.
- Rafnia rostrata G.J.Campb. & B.-E.van Wyk
- Rafnia schlechteriana Schinz
- Rafnia spicata Thunb.
- Rafnia triflora Thunb.
- Rafnia virens E. Mey.
- Rafnia vlokii G.J.Campb. & B.-E.van Wyk
