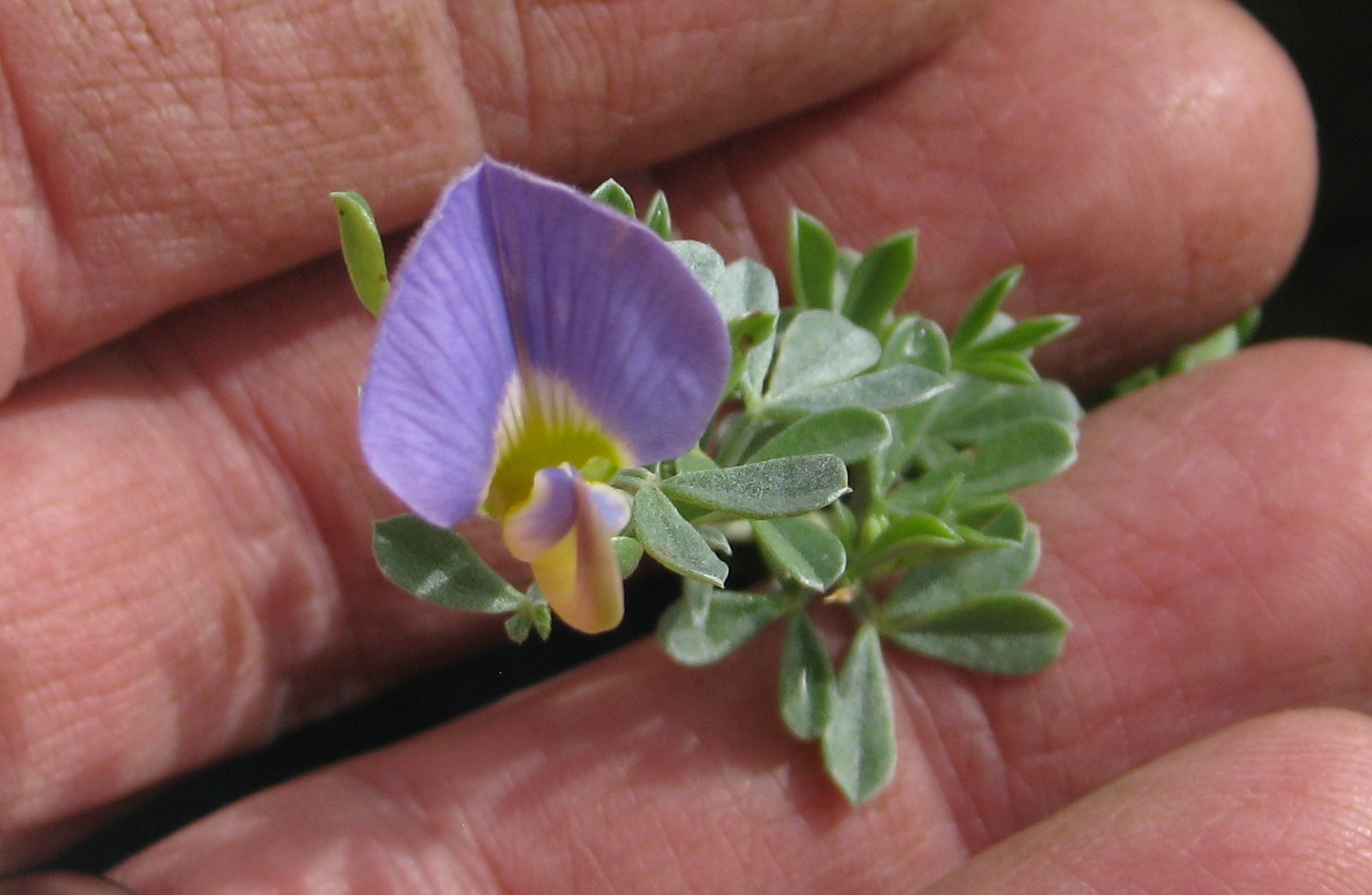
- Lotononis galpinii

Scientific classification
- Kingdom: Plantae
- Clade: Tracheophytes
- Clade: Angiosperms
- Clade: Eudicots
- Clade: Rosids
- Order: Fabales
- Family: Fabaceae
- Subfamily: Faboideae
- Tribe: Crotalarieae
- Genus: Lotononis (DC.) Eckl. & Zeyh. (1836)

Type species
- Lotononis prostrata (L.) Benth.

Species
- 99; see text

Synonyms
- Amphinomia DC. (1825); Aulacinthus E.Mey. (1836); Buchenroedera Eckl. & Zeyh. (1835); Capnitis E.Mey. (1836); Colobotus E.Mey. (1836); Krebsia Eckl. & Zeyh. (1836); Lapasathus C.Presl (1845); Leptidium C.Presl (1845), nom. superfl.; Leptis E.Mey. ex Eckl. & Zeyh. (1836); Lipozygis E.Mey. (1836); Polylobium Eckl. & Zeyh. (1836); Telina E.Mey. (1836)

= Lotononis =

Genus of legumes

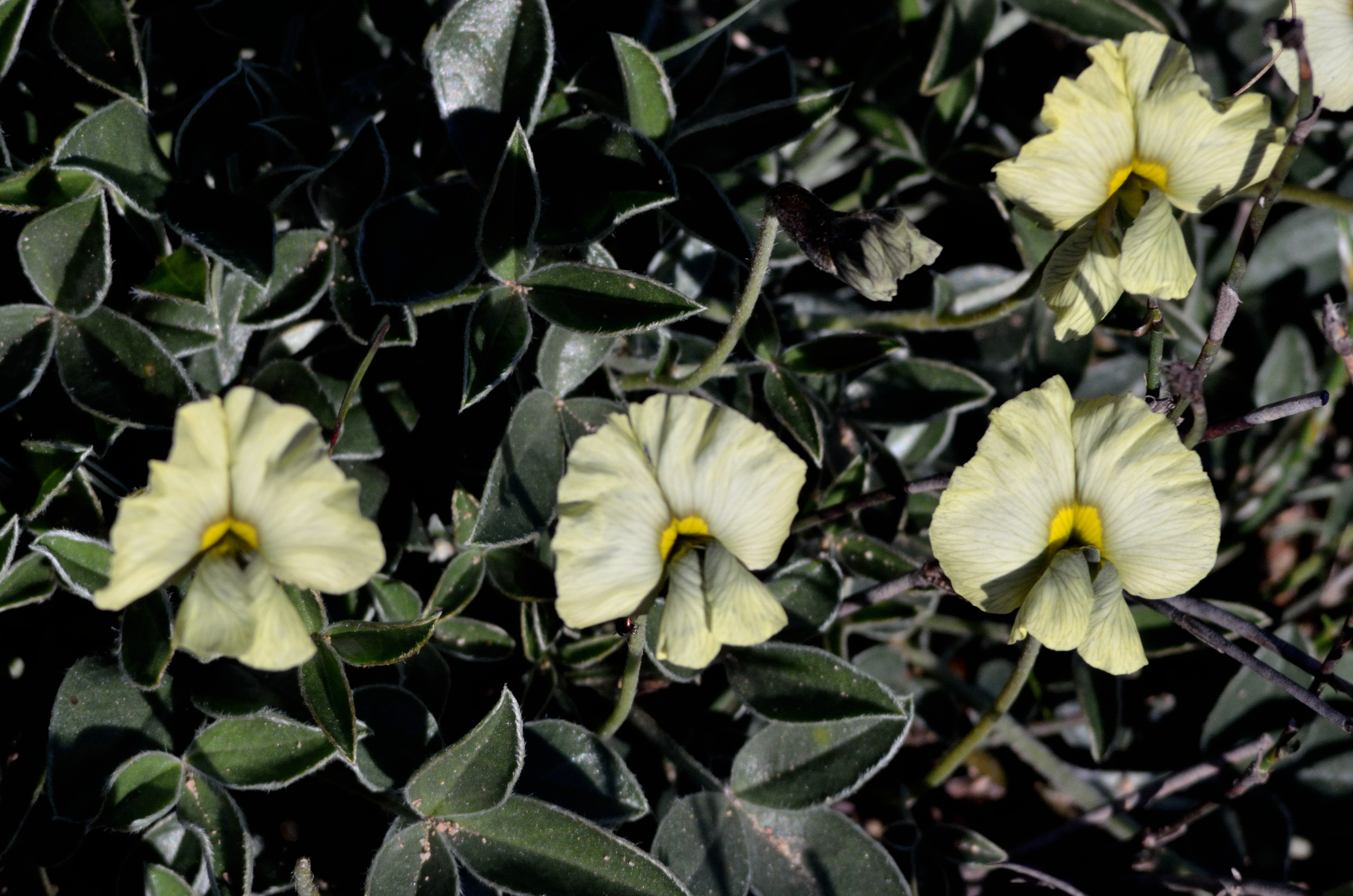
Lotononis sp.

Lotononis is a genus of flowering plants in the family Fabaceae and the tribe Crotalarieae. The genus includes 99 species of annual and perennial herbs, native to the southeastern Europe (Greece and Bulgaria) and Turkey, eastern Africa (Ethiopia to Malawi), and southern Africa (Angola and Zimbabwe to South Africa).

== Species ==
Several species were recently transferred from Lotononis to four new or restored genera (Euchlora, Ezoloba, Leobordea, and Listia). The species retained in Lotononis are:

- Lotononis acocksii B.-E. van Wyk
- Lotononis acuminata Eckl. & Zeyh.
- Lotononis acutiflora Benth.
- Lotononis affinis Burtt Davy
- Lotononis ambigua Dummer
- Lotononis angustifolia (E. Mey.) Steud.
- Lotononis arenicola De Wild.
- Lotononis argentea Eckl. & Zeyh.
- Lotononis argyrella MacOwan
- Lotononis azurea (Eckl. & Zeyh.) Benth.
- Lotononis azureoides B.-E. van Wyk
- Lotononis bachmanniana Dummer
- Lotononis barberae Dummer
- Lotononis basutica E. Phillips
- Lotononis biflora (Bolus) Dummer
- Lotononis brachyantha Harms
- Lotononis brevicaulis B.-E. van Wyk
- Lotononis brierleyae Baker f.
- Lotononis burchellii Benth.
- Lotononis caerulescens (E. Mey.) B.-E. van Wyk
- Lotononis carinalis Harv.
- Lotononis carnea B.-E. van Wyk
- Lotononis carnosa Benth.
- Lotononis clandestina (E. Mey.) Benth.
- Lotononis comptonii B.-E. van Wyk
- Lotononis crumanina Burch. ex Benth.
- Lotononis curtii Harms
- Lotononis curvicarpa B.-E. van Wyk
- Lotononis dahlgrenii B.-E. van Wyk
- Lotononis debilis Benth.
- Lotononis delicata (Baker f.) Polhill
- Lotononis delicatula De Wild.
- Lotononis dichiloides Sond.
- Lotononis dieterlenii E. Phillips
- Lotononis dissitinodis B.-E. van Wyk
- Lotononis dregeana Dummer
- Lotononis elongata (Thunb.) D. Dietr.
- Lotononis erisemoides (Ficalho & Hiern) Torre
- Lotononis evansiana Burtt Davy
- Lotononis exstipulata L. Bolus
- Lotononis falcata (E. Mey.) Benth.
- Lotononis flava Dummer
- Lotononis fruticoides B.-E. van Wyk
- Lotononis galpinii Dummer
- Lotononis glabra (Thunb.) D.Dietr.
- Lotononis gracilifolia B.-E. van Wyk
- Lotononis gracilis Benth.
- Lotononis humilior Dummer
- Lotononis involucrata (P.J. Bergius) Benth.
  - subsp. involucrata (P.J. Bergius) Benth.
  - subsp. peduncularis (E. Mey.) B.-E. van Wyk
- Lotononis lamprifolia B.-E. van Wyk
- Lotononis laxa Eckl. & Zeyh.
- Lotononis lenticula (E. Mey.) Benth.
- Lotononis leptoloba Bolus
- Lotononis listii Polhill
- Lotononis listioides Dinter & Harms
- Lotononis lotononoides (Scott-Elliot) B.-E. van Wyk
- Lotononis macra Schltr.
- Lotononis macrosepala Conrath
- Lotononis maculata Dummer
- Lotononis maximiliani Schltr. ex De Wild.
- Lotononis meyeri (C. Presl) B.-E. van Wyk
- Lotononis micrantha (E. Mey.) Benth.
- Lotononis microphylla Harv.
- Lotononis minor Dummer & Jenn.
- Lotononis monophylla Harv.
- Lotononis myriantha Baker
- Lotononis neglecta Dummer
- Lotononis nutans B.-E. van Wyk
- Lotononis ornata Dummer
- Lotononis oxyptera (E. Mey.) Benth.
- Lotononis pachycarpa Dinter ex B.-E. van Wyk
- Lotononis pallens Benth.
- Lotononis pallidirosea Dinter & Harms
- Lotononis parviflora (P.J. Bergius) D. Dietr.
- Lotononis pauciflora Dummer
- Lotononis perplexa (E. Mey.) Eckl. & Zeyh.
- Lotononis pottiae Burtt Davy
- Lotononis prostrata (L.) Benth.
- Lotononis pseudodelicata (Torre) Polhill
- Lotononis pulchella (E. Mey.) B.-E. van Wyk
- Lotononis pumila Eckl. & Zeyh.
- Lotononis pungens Eckl. & Zeyh.
- Lotononis purpurascens B.-E. van Wyk
- Lotononis rabenaviana Dinter & Harms
- Lotononis racemiflora B.-E. van Wyk
- Lotononis rara Dummer
- Lotononis rigida (E. Mey.) Benth.
- Lotononis rostrata Benth.
  - subsp. namaquensis (Bolus) B.-E. van Wyk
  - subsp. rostrata Benth.
- Lotononis sabulosa T.M. Salter
- Lotononis schwansiana Dinter
- Lotononis sericophylla Benth.
- Lotononis serpentinicola Wild
- Lotononis sparsiflora (E.Mey.) B.-E. van Wyk
- Lotononis stricta (Eckl. & Zeyh.) B.-E. van Wyk
- Lotononis strigillosa (Merxm. & A.Schreib.) A.Schreib.
- Lotononis tenella (E.Mey.) Eckl. & Zeyh.
- Lotononis tenuifolia (Eckl. & Zeyh.) Dummer
- Lotononis tenuipes Burtt Davy
- Lotononis tenuis Baker
- Lotononis trichodes (E. Mey.) B.-E. van Wyk
- Lotononis umbellata (L.) Benth.
- Lotononis varia (E. Mey.) Steud.
- Lotononis versicolor Benth.
- Lotononis viborgioides Benth.
- Lotononis villosa Benth.
- Lotononis woodii Bolus
- Lotononis wyliei J.M. Wood
