= Erik Viborg =

Danish botanist

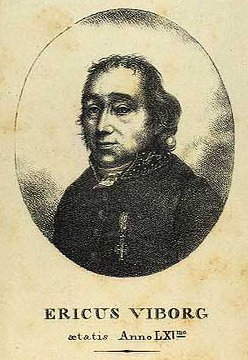
Erik Viborg in 1820

Erik Nissen Viborg (5 April 1759 – 25 September 1822) was a Danish veterinarian and botanist.A genus of legumes Wiborgia was named by Carl Peter Thunberg in honour of Viborg.

== Early life and education ==
Viborg was born on 5 April 1759 in Bedsted, Sønderjylland, the son of parish priest Carl Viborg (1706–82) and Marie Sophie Friis (1721–89). He was taught privately by his father at home. In 1777 he enrolled at the University of Copenhagen where he initially studied theology and Oriental languages. After three years, he gave up the study of theology and turned to the study of physics, mathematics and natural history.

His studies of natural history introduced him to Peter Christian Abildgaard who endorsed him to pursue a career in veterinary sciences. After a year of study at the Cetenary School in Christianshavn, Viborg was employed as an assistant teacher with an annual salary of 200 Danish rigsdaler.

== Career ==
From 1784 to 1787, Viborg travelled in Europe. After his return, he won a prize from the Royal Danish Academy of Sciences and Letters for his thesis about the ‘sand plants’ (mainly Marram grass) and their use as sand-binders in protection of agricultural lands from aeolian sand. He was then appointed teacher (with the title of professor) at the Veterinary School (1787–1790). In 1796, King Christian VII of Denmark sent Viborg to Poland and Romania to purchase stallions for the Frederiksborg stud farm. When the chair of botany was installed in 1797 at the University of Copenhagen, Viborg became its first holder, surpassing Martin Vahl. This was probably achieved more through ties to the upper circles than through scientific merit. After the death of Abildgaard in 1801, Viborg became professor and rector of the Veterinary School, a position he held to his death. In 1816, he was elected a foreign member of the Royal Swedish Academy of Sciences.

The legume genus Wiborgia Thunb. was named for him.

== Awards ==
In 1809 Viborg was created a knight of the Order of the Dannebrog.
