= Ben-Erik van Wyk =

South African a professor of indigenous botany (1956-

Professor Ben-Erik van Wyk FAAS
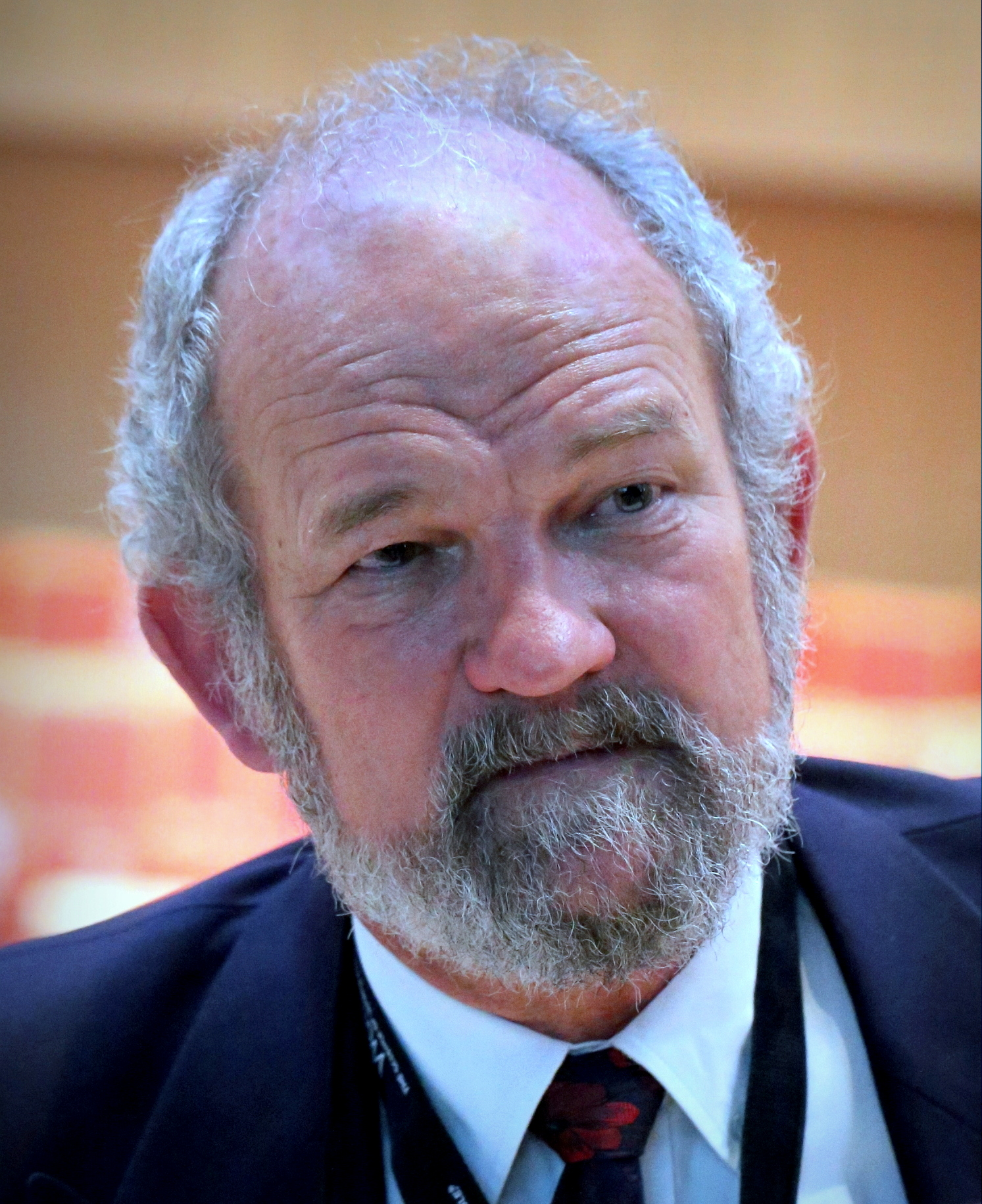
- Born: December 27, 1956 (age 68); Bellville, South Africa
- Education: Stellenbosch University (BSc, MSc); University of Cape Town (PhD)
- Known for: Hypocalypteae, Leobordea platycarpa, Stirtonanthus, Leobordea, Wiborgiella, Choritaenia
- Scientific career
- Fields: Botany; Traditional African medicine Taxonomy; Chemotaxonomy; Ethnobotany
- Institutions: University of Johannesburg; Rand Afrikaans University
- Thesis: A taxonomic study of the genus Lotononis (DC.) Eckl. & Zeyh.(Fabzceae, Crotalarieae) (1989)
- Author abbrev. (botany): B.-E.van Wyk
- Website: http://www.ben-erikvanwyk.com/

Ben-Erik van Wyk FAAS (born 27 December 1956 in Bellville) is a South African professor of indigenous botany and traditional African medicine at the University of Johannesburg.

== Early life and education ==
Ben-Erik van Wyk was born on 27 December 1956 in Bellville, South Africa. In 1979, he received a Bachelor of Science from Stellenbosch University in Forestry and Nature Conservation. In 1983, he graduated cum laude with a Master of Science. In 1989, he obtained a Doctor of Philosophy from the University of Cape Town.

== Career and research ==
Since 1984, Van Wyk has been teaching at the Rand Afrikaans University, where he has been a professor since 1990. Since 2005, he has been a professor at the Department of Botany and Plant Biotechnology, University of Johannesburg, where the Rand Afrikaans University has been absorbed.

Van Wyk researches African plant plant classification (taxonomy and chemotaxonomy) particularly for Apiaceae, Fabaceae, Aloe, and Asphodelaceae. In addition, he focuses on medicinal plants and ethnobotany, including the ethnobotany of Khoisan and Afrikaners from the Western Cape. He is also involved in quality control and product development of medicinal plant products and crop development.

Van Wyk is a member of several organizations, including the Aloe Council of South Africa (Chair), the American Society of Plant Taxonomists, the Botanical Society of America, the Indigenous Plant Use Forum (Chair since 1996), the Association for African Medicinal Plant Standards, Briza Publications CC, and the Presidential Task Team on African Traditional Medicine. He is a Member of the Editorial Board of the South African Journal of Botany, the Official Journal of the South African Association of Botanists.

== Awards and honours ==
Van Wyk has received several awards, including the Schlich Medal in 1980, the FRD President's Award in 1991, the Havenga prize for Biology from the South African Academy of Science and Art in 2006, the Silver Medal from the South African Association of Botanists in 2007, and the Medal of Honor from the Faculty of Natural Science and Technology of the South African Academy of Science and Art in 2011.

Van Wyk was elected a Fellow of the African Academy of Sciences in 2013.

== Publications ==
Van Wyk has (co-)authored more than two hundred articles in scientific journals and (co-)authored more than 180 botanical names. His books and commentary have been published in Afrikaans, German, Polish and Korean, in addition to the English-language editions.
