= Euchlora =

Scientific classification
- Kingdom: Plantae
- Clade: Tracheophytes
- Clade: Angiosperms
- Clade: Eudicots
- Clade: Rosids
- Order: Fabales
- Family: Fabaceae
- Subfamily: Faboideae
- Tribe: Crotalarieae
- Genus: Euchlora; Eckl. & Zeyh. (1836)
- Species: E. hirsuta

Binomial name
- Euchlora hirsuta (Thunb.) Druce (1916 publ. 1917)

Synonyms
- Crotalaria serpens E.Mey. (1832); Euchlora serpens (E.Mey.) Eckl. & Zeyh. (1836); Lotononis sect. Euchlora (Eckl. & Zeyh.) B.-E. van Wyk 1991; Lotononis hirsuta (Thunb.) D.Dietr. (1847); Lotononis serpens (E.Mey.) R.Dahlgren (1964); Microtropis E.Mey. (1836); Microtropis hirsuta (Thunb.) E.Mey. (1836); Ononis hirsuta Thunb. (1800); Rafnia axillaris Willd. ex Walp. (1840), not validly publ.

Genus of legumes

Euchlora hirsuta is a species of flowering plant in the legume family, Fabaceae. It is a tuberous geophyte endemic to the Cape Provinces of South Africa. It is the only species included in the genus Euchlora, which is part of tribe Crotalarieae.
