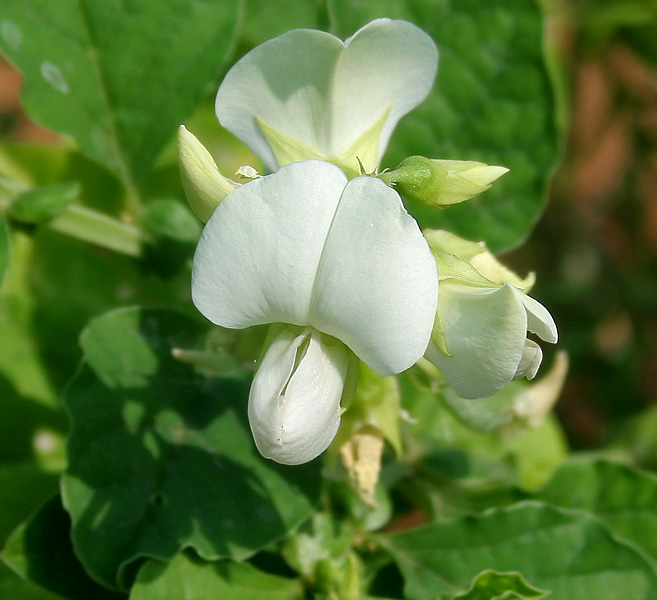

Scientific classification
- Kingdom: Plantae
- Clade: Tracheophytes
- Clade: Angiosperms
- Clade: Eudicots
- Clade: Rosids
- Order: Fabales
- Family: Fabaceae
- Subfamily: Faboideae
- Genus: Crotalaria
- Species: C. verrucosa

Binomial name
- Crotalaria verrucosa L.

Synonyms
- List: Anisanthera hastata Raf.; Crotalaria angulosa Lam.; Crotalaria flexuosa Moench; Crotalaria hastata Steud.; Phaseolus bulae Blanco

= Crotalaria verrucosa =

Species of legume

Crotalaria verrucosa, the blue rattlepod, is a species of flowering plant in the legume family, Fabaceae. This shrub belongs to the subfamily Faboideae. The herb can be found in tropical and subtropical areas from in Bangladesh to Sri Lanka in South Asia, Southeast Asia, Australasia and Central America.

Crotalaria verrucosa is a perennial shrub that grows to about 50 to 100 cm in height.

== Cultural Significance ==
Crotalaria verrucosa (பகன்றை) flower has historical, cultural significance as it is referred to in Tamil literature especially in Sangam literature.

== Image gallery ==
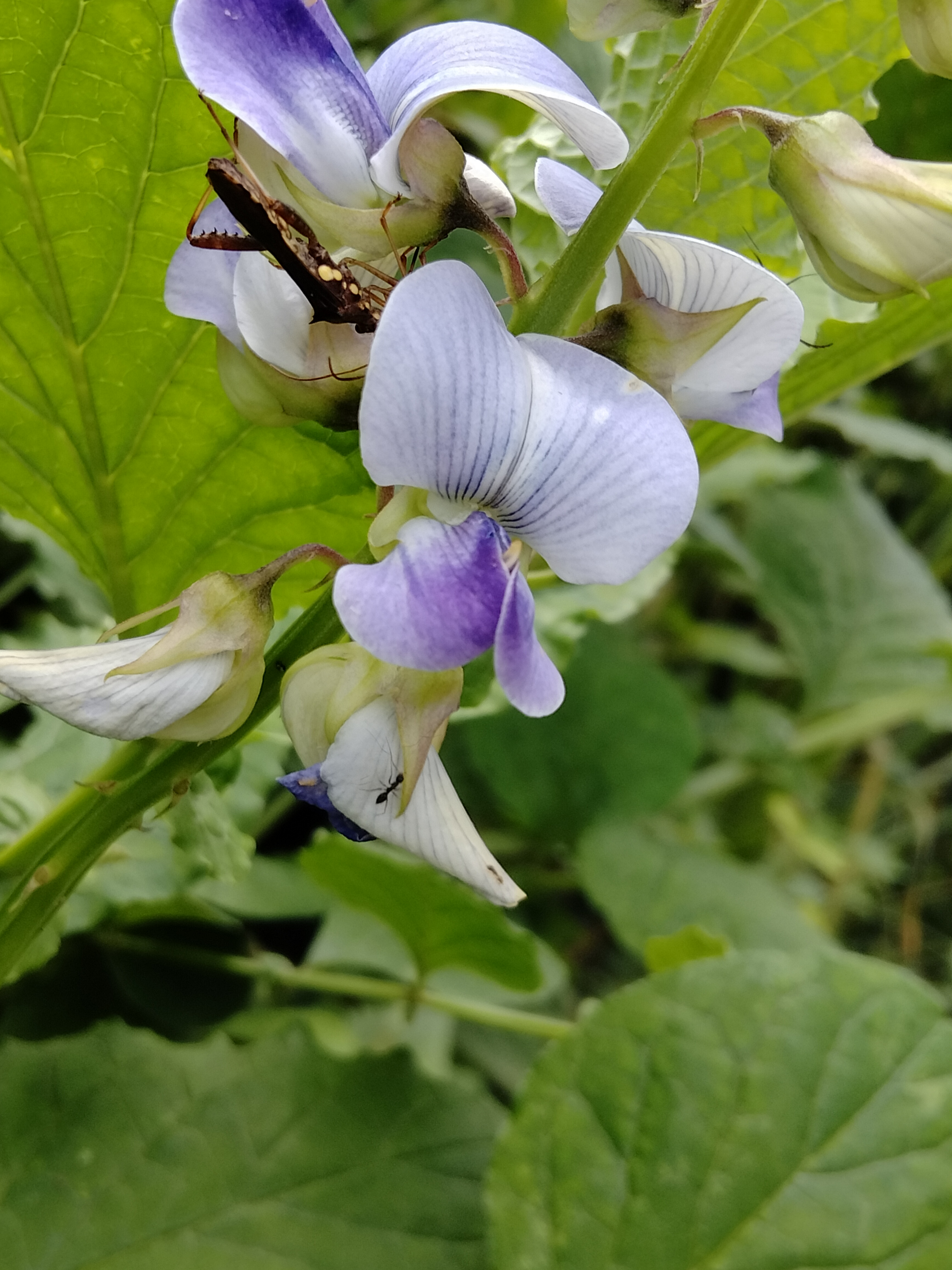
Crotalaria verrucosa flower

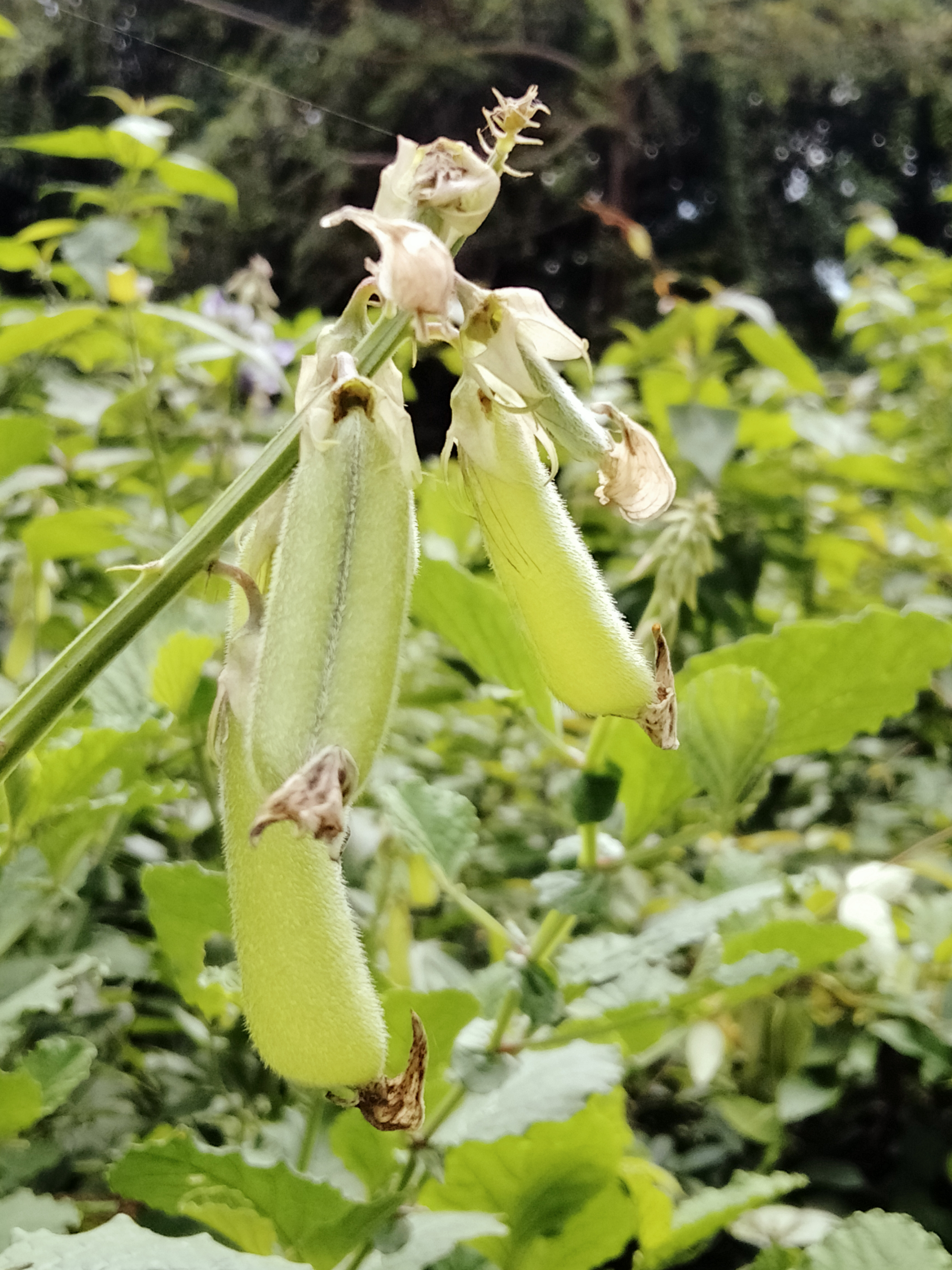
Crotalaria verrucosa fruits

Crotalaria verrucosa plant
