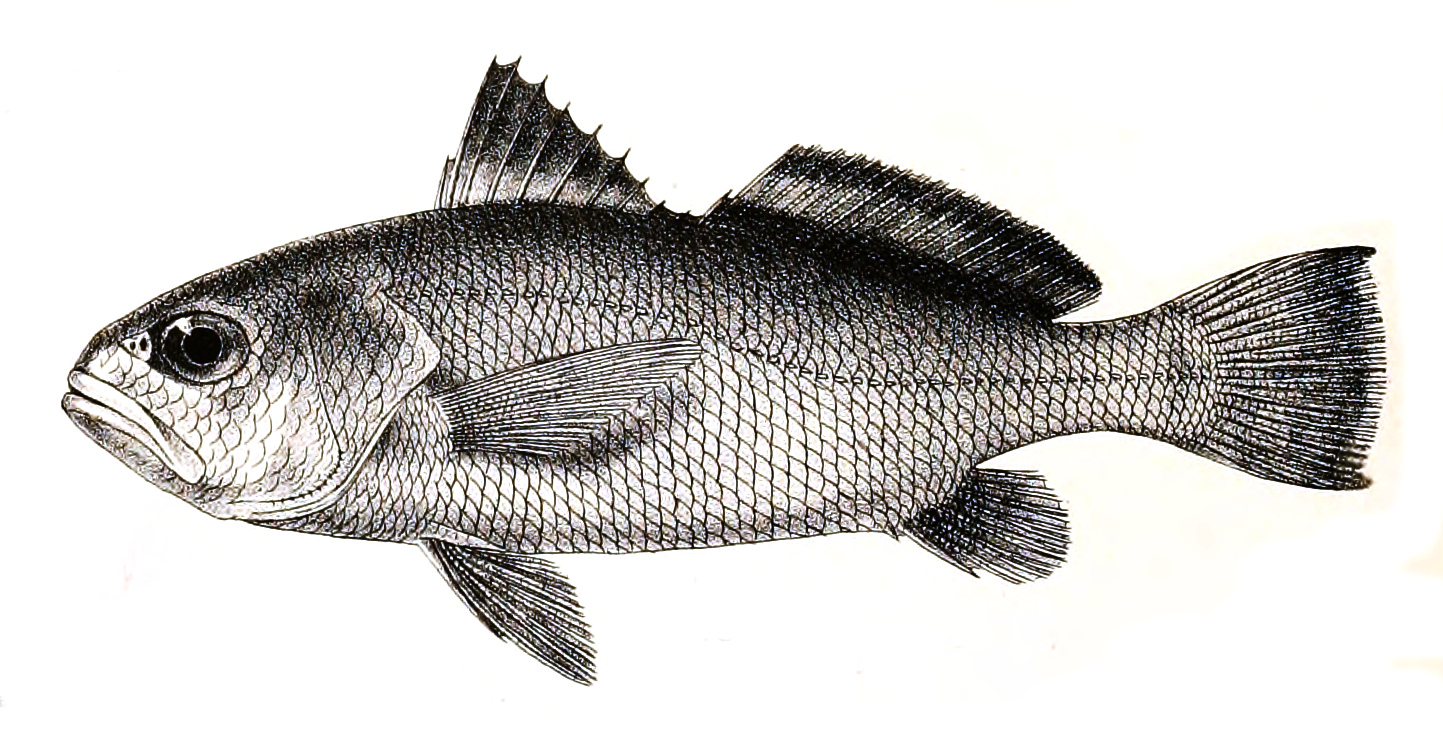

Scientific classification
- Kingdom: Animalia
- Phylum: Chordata
- Class: Actinopterygii
- Order: Acanthuriformes
- Family: Sciaenidae
- Genus: Pennahia; Fowler, 1926

Type species
- Otolithus macrophthalmus Bleeker, 1849

= Pennahia =

Genus of fishes

Pennahia is a genus of marine ray-finned fishes belonging to the family Sciaenidae, the drums and croakers. The fishes in this genus are found in the Indo-West Pacific region.

== Taxonomy ==
Pennahia was first proposed as a subgenus of Johnius in 1926 by the American ichthyologist Henry Weed Fowler with Otolithus macrophthalmus, which had been described by Pieter Bleeker in 1849 from Jakarta, as the type species. O. macropthalmus was later shown to be synonymous with Johnius aneus, a species described by Marcus Elieser Bloch from Malabar in 1793. This genus has been placed in the subfamily Otolithinae by some workers, but the 5th edition of Fishes of the World does not recognise subfamilies within the Sciaenidae which it places in the order Acanthuriformes.

== Etymology ==
Pennahia derives from pinnah, a local Tamil name for the type species.

== Species ==
Pennahia contains the following recognised species:

- Pennahia aneus (Bloch, 1793) (Donkey croaker)
- Pennahia argentata (Houttuyn, 1782) (Silver croaker)
- Pennahia macrocephalus (Tang, 1937) (Big-head pennah croaker)
- Pennahia ovata Sasaki, 1996
- Pennahia pawak (Lin, 1940) (Pawak croaker)

== Characteristics ==
Pennahia croakers have a pair of pores on the tip of the chin, one on either side of the tip, and these are not connected by a groove. The swim bladder is shaped like a carrot and has branched appendages along the whole of each side with the forward most appendages not crossing the transverse septum. The branches have poorly developed upper limbs. The sagitta is shaped like a tadpole and hasi its "tail" only slightly arched. The largest species in the genus is the silver croaker P. argentata which has a maximum published standard length of 40 cm (16 in) while the smallest P. ovata which has a maximum published standard length of 18.7 cm (7.4 in).

== Distribution ==
Pennahia croakers are found in the Indo-West Pacific region from the Persian Gulf and Arabian Sea east to the north western Pacific Ocean.
