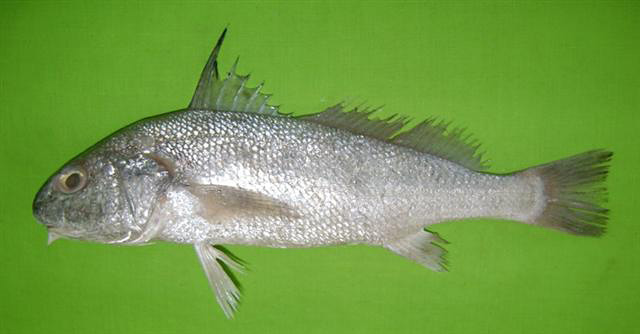

Conservation status
- Least Concern (IUCN 3.1)

Scientific classification
- Kingdom: Animalia
- Phylum: Chordata
- Class: Actinopterygii
- Order: Acanthuriformes
- Family: Sciaenidae
- Genus: Johnius
- Subgenus: Johnius (Johnius)
- Species: J. amblycephalus

Binomial name
- Johnius amblycephalus (Bleeker, 1855)

Synonyms
- Umbrina amblycephala Bleeker, 1855; Umbrina dussumieri Valenciennes, 1833; Blythia dussumieri (Valenciennes, 1833); Dendrophysa dussumieri (Valenciennes, 1833); Johnius dussumieri (Valenciennes, 1833); Sciaena dussumieri (Valenciennes, 1833); Umbrina muelleri Klunzinger, 1879

= Johnius amblycephalus =

Species of fish

Johnius amblycephalus, the bearded croaker, also known as the green-backed croaker or sharp-nosed jewfish, is a marine ray-finned fish belonging to the family Sciaenidae, the drums and croakers. This fish is found in the Indian and Pacific Oceans.

== Taxonomy ==
Johnius amblycephalus was first formally described as Umbrina amblycephala in 1855 by the Dutch physician, herpetologist and ichthyologist Pieter Bleeker with its type locality given as Ambon Island. Bleeker's name replaced Umbrina dussumieri which had been coined by Achille Valenciennes in 1833 but which was invalid as it was preoccupied by Georges Cuvier's 1830 Corvina dussumieri. This species is classified within the nominate subgenus of Johnius. This species has been placed in the subfamily Otolithinae by some workers, but the 5th edition of Fishes of the World does not recognise subfamilies within the Sciaenidae which it places in the order Acanthuriformes.

== Etymology ==
Johnius amblycephalus has a specific name, amblycephalus, which means "blunt head" and this is an allusion to its relatively blunt snout in comparison to Johnius dussumieri.

== Description ==
Johnius amblycaphalus has its dorsal fin supported by a total of 11 spines and between 23 and 26 soft rays while the anal fin is supported by 2 spines and 7 soft rays. The second to the fifth spines in the first dorsal fin are elongated. The rear edge of the caudal fin can be truncate, rhomboidal or s-shaped. The chin has a single thick, blunt barbel. The overall colour is black or dark brown on the back and whitish or pale yellow on the sides and belly. The spiny dorsal fin is black towards its margin. This species has a maximum published total length of 25 cm (9.8 in) , although 15 cm (5.9 in) is more typical.

== Distribution and habitat ==
Johnius amblycephalus is found in the Indo-Pacific region where it occurs from the Persian Gulf to Papua New Guinea, north to southern China and Taiwan and south to Australia. Its presence off Africa is unconfirmed and may be confusion with Johnius fuscolineatus. It is found at depths between 0 and 28 m (0 and 92 ft) in shallow coastal waters and estuaries where there are sand, mud or muddy sand substrates as well as among soft corals, sponges, antipathrians, and algae.
