= Heinrich Julius Lebeck =

Dutch naturalist

Heinrich Julius Lebeck (1772 – 12 June 1800) was a Ceylon-born Dutch naturalist and specimen collector. He was educated in southern India, at a school run by missionary Christoph Samuel John, and later became a student of naturalist Carl Peter Thunberg. He described the Gangetic dolphin, and the plant genus Lebeckia and the fish Ichthyscopus lebeck were named after him.

Lebeck was born in Dutch Ceylon to a Dutch government servant named Abraham Evert de Lebecq (1746–1777). He went to study at a school in Tranquebar, India, run by C. S. John. He probably knew Tamil which he called his "native language". After around 1793 he arrived in Europe. He was living in Sweden and was a regular visitor of Carl Thunberg and began to study botany. In 1795 he received a testamur from Uppsala University where he was registered under the name Henricus Julius Lebeck Ceylonensis. He left Gothenburg for Bombay as Dutch ships were unavailable due to war. He then travelled to Tranquebar where he met C.S. John, Johan Peter Rottler and Johann Gottfried Klein and received a diploma from Berlin's Naturforschende Freunde. He visited Sri Lanka and then went to Batavia in 1798 where he worked as a mint-master for the Dutch East India Company. He collected specimens of natural history. Thunberg named the plant genus Lebeckia after him. John wrote to Marcus Bloch to name a fish after him which was ultimately described by Johann Gottlob Theaenus Schneider following the death of Bloch as Uranoscopus lebeck (now known as Ichthyscopus lebeck). He died in Java in 1800.
