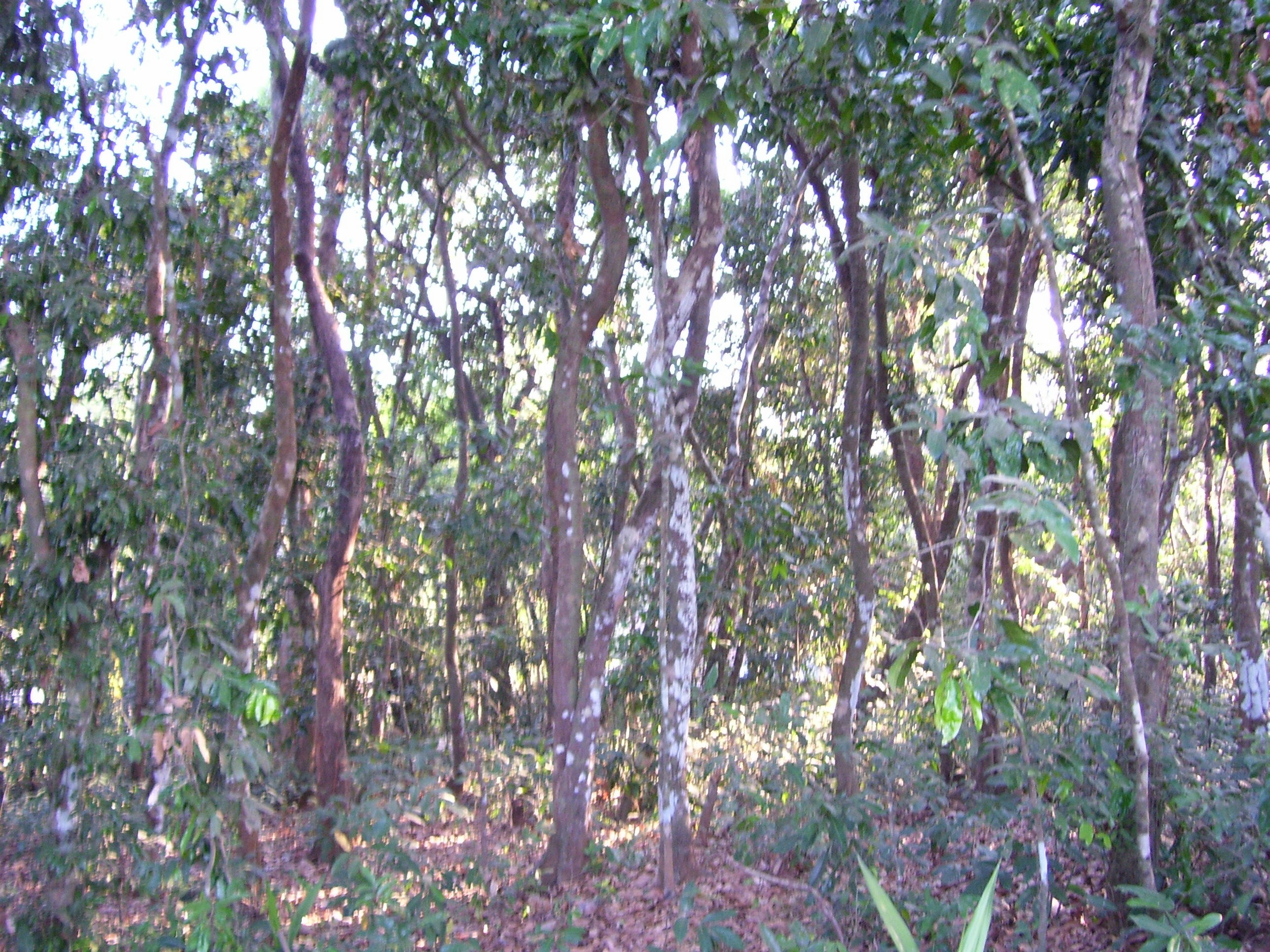

Conservation status
- Data Deficient (IUCN 2.3)

Scientific classification
- Kingdom: Plantae
- Clade: Tracheophytes
- Clade: Angiosperms
- Clade: Eudicots
- Clade: Asterids
- Order: Ericales
- Family: Ebenaceae
- Genus: Diospyros
- Species: D. ebenum

Binomial name
- Diospyros ebenum J.Koenig ex Retz.

Synonyms
- Diospyros glaberrima Rottler; Diospyros melanoxylon Willd.; Diospyros membranacea A.DC.; Diospyros reticulata var. timoriana A.DC.; Diospyros laurifolia A.Rich.; Diospyros timoriana (A.DC.) Miq.; Diospyros assimilis Bedd.

= Diospyros ebenum =

Species of flowering plant

Ceylon ebony or Diospyros ebenum (Sinhala: කළුවර Kaluwara) (Tamil: கருங்காலி Karungaali), is a species of tree in the genus Diospyros and the family Ebenaceae. The tree produces valuable black wood.

== Description ==
This middle-height evergreen tree grows very slowly, up to 20–25 metres (65–80 ft) tall. The leaves are elliptical with a prolonged oval form, about 6–15 centimetres (2.5–6 in) long and 3–5 centimetres (1–2 in) wide. The fruit is not very big, approximately 2 centimetres (0.8 in) in diameter, resembling a small persimmon fruit.

== Habitat ==
The tree occurs in southern India, Sri Lanka and Indonesia. In Sinhalese, the tree is known as කළුවර ගස් (Kaluwara Gas), due to its hard black wood.

== Wood ==
The sap wood of Diospyros ebenum is light-yellowish gray, with a glossy-black core occasionally containing light fibers. The wood also has metallic gloss with fine, smooth texture whose grains can be straight, a bit chaotically organized and wavy.

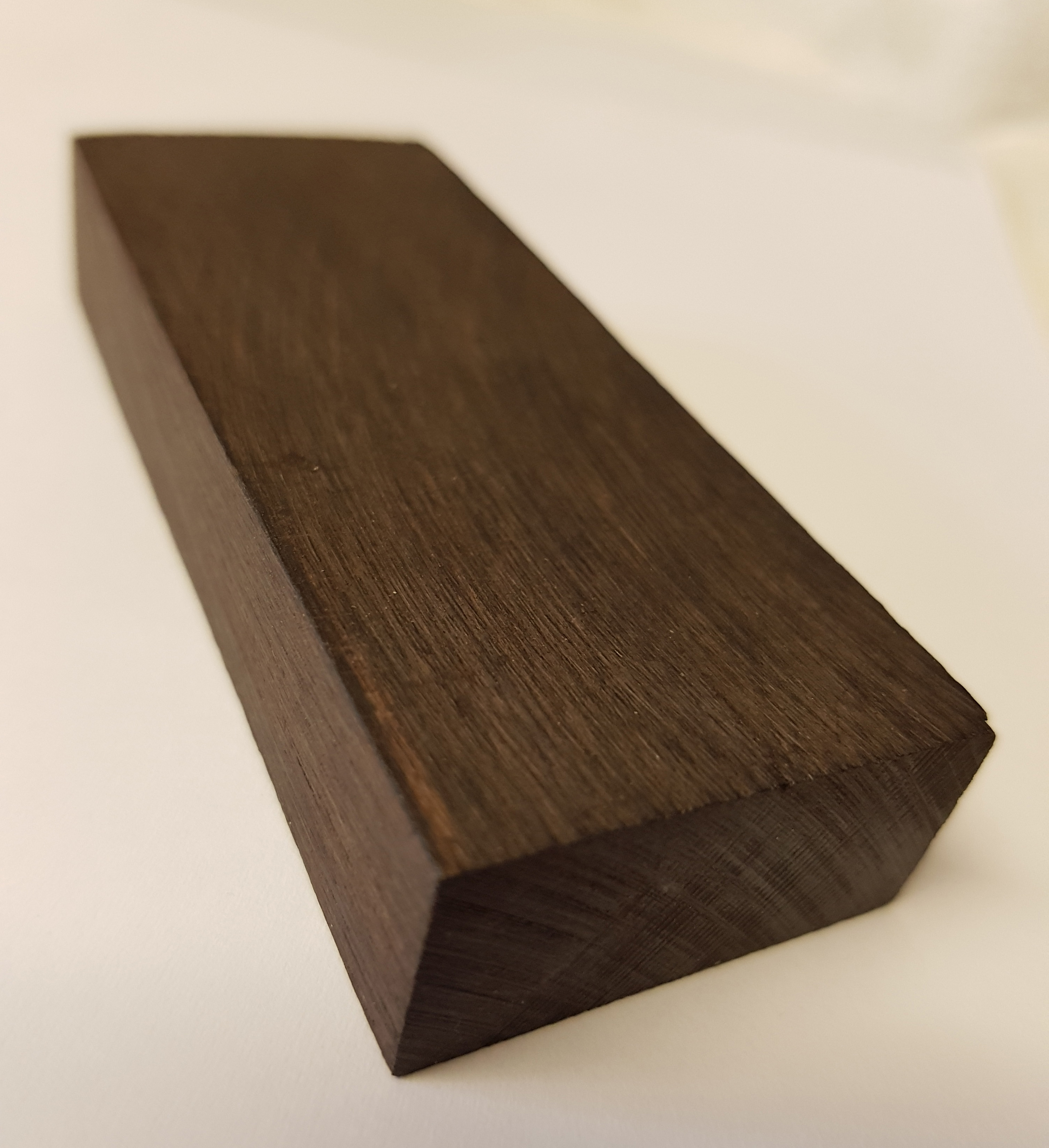
Sawn block of Diospyros ebenum

In Sri Lanka, it is illegal to harvest and sell ebony wood. It possesses the following valuable qualities: high wood hardness (twice as hard as oak), easy to polish (suitable for high-quality polishing, after which it becomes perfectly smooth), it has practically no pitting, provides glossy smooth surface, water and termite-resistant. The tree's wood density is extremely high (up to 1,200 kg/m^{3} (2,000 lb/cu yd)), making it sink in water. It is also hard to treat both manually and mechanically. The wood itself is short grain, subject to cracking.

The polished wood is cold to the touch, and its heat emissions are so high that it causes melting of metal vessels in which the wood is burnt.

== Uses ==
In the 16th—19th centuries, the best furniture was made of Ceylon ebony. The wood was preferred for making door and window handles, tableware shanks, while the cuttings were used for knitting needles and hooks or razor handles. Today, the wood is commonly used in decorative wooden inlays, handmade artwork, and for parts of musical instruments that tend to receive the most wear: piano keys, fingerboards and necks for fretted and bowed instruments, pegs, tailpieces, and nuts. It's also commonly used in turnery to make knife handles, brush holders, and chopsticks. It is also used to treat eye infections in Unani medicine.

== Protection ==
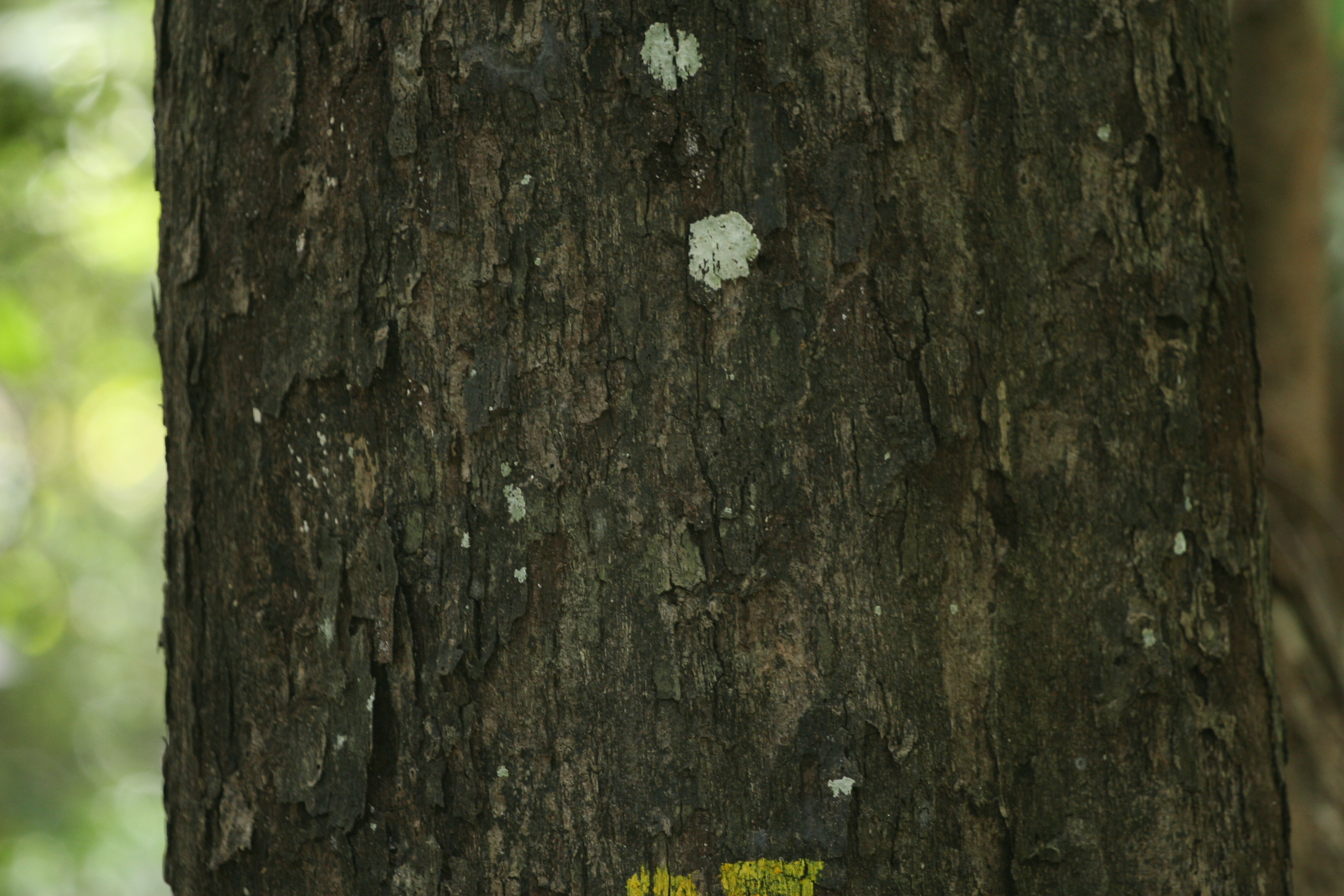
Diospyros ebenum bark

The high demand of Ceylon ebony wood has threatened this species with extinction. In 1994, the World Conservation Union, currently known as IUCN, included Ceylon ebony tree into the Red Book. However, as of 1998, IUCN has insufficient data about this species. Both India and Sri Lanka have laws prohibiting international trade of the wood.
