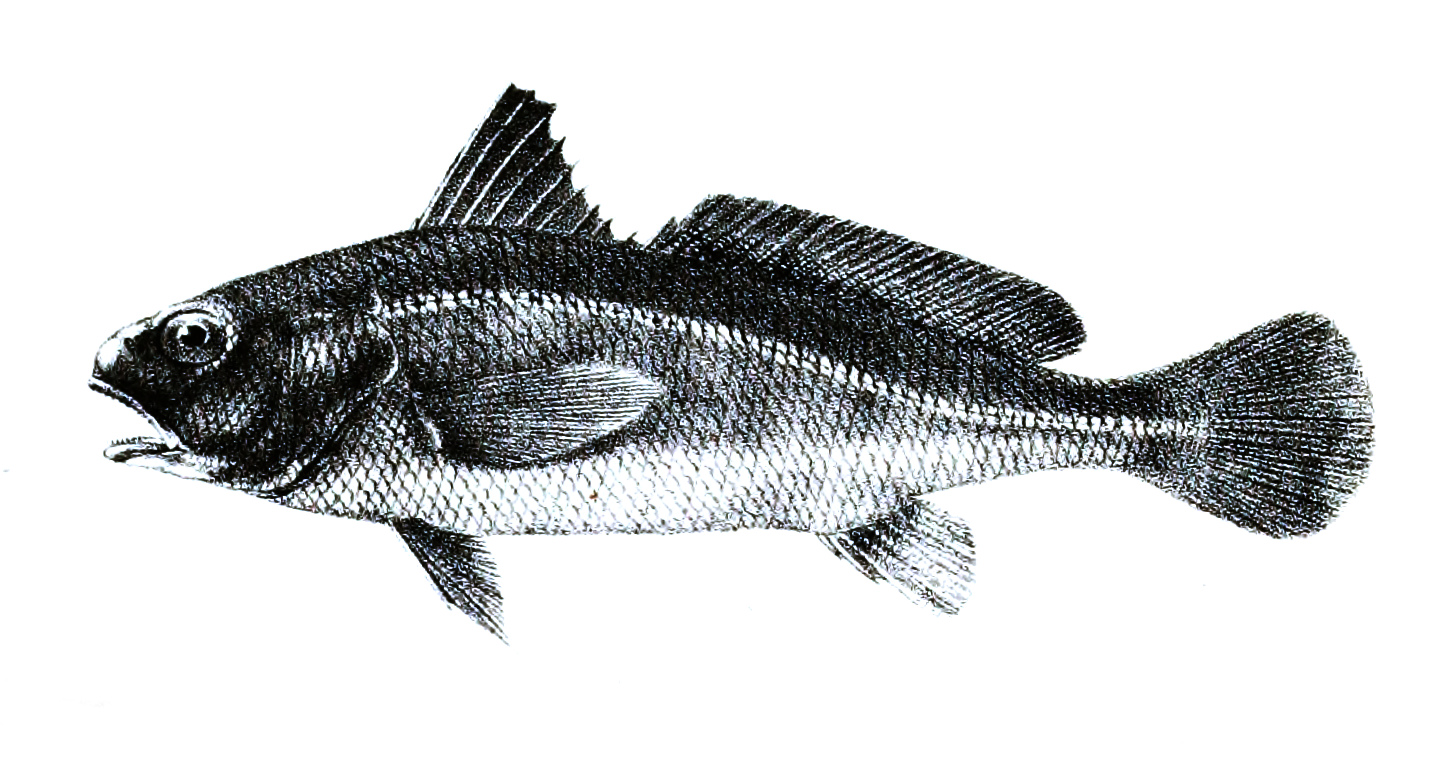

Conservation status
- Least Concern (IUCN 3.1)

Scientific classification
- Kingdom: Animalia
- Phylum: Chordata
- Class: Actinopterygii
- Order: Acanthuriformes
- Family: Sciaenidae
- Genus: Johnius
- Subgenus: Johnius (Johnius)
- Species: J. carutta

Binomial name
- Johnius carutta Bloch, 1793

Synonyms
- Sciaena carutta (Bloch, 1793)

= Johnius carutta =

Species of fish

Johnius carutta, the karut croaker or purple jewfish, is a species of marine ray-finned fish belonging to the family Sciaenidae, the drums and croakers. This species is found in the western Indian Ocean.

== Taxonomy ==
Johnius carutta was first formally described in 1793 by the German physician and naturalist Marcus Elieser Bloch with its type locality given as estuary of the Hooghly River near Diamond Harbour in India. When he described the species Bloch created the new genus Johnius and in this species was designated as the type species of the genus in 1861 by Theodore Gill and in 1876 by Pieter Bleeker. This species has been placed in the subfamily Otolithinae by some workers, but the 5th edition of Fishes of the World does not recognise subfamilies within the Sciaenidae which it places in the order Acanthuriformes.

== Etymology ==
Johnius carutta has a specific name which is derived from Karutta Kattolei, the Malayalam name for this species.

== Description ==
Johnius carutta has a deeply incised dorsal fin, the part of the dorsal fin anterior to the incision is supported by 10 spines and the part to the rear of the incision is supported by a single spine and between 26 and 29 soft rays. The anal fin contains 2 spines and 7 soft rays. The caudal fin may have either a truncate or weak s-shaped rear margin. The standard length of the body is 2.9 to 3.8 times its depth. The teeth in the lower jaw are all the same size. The pores on the chin may be surrounded by thickened skin but this does not resemble a tag. The scales on the head and front part of the body are cycloid with ctenoid scales on the rear part of the body. The colour of the body is dull grey with irregular darker markings, like stains, on the back, there is a golden-yellow horizontal stripe along the flanks and the lateral line is silver. The belly is golden-silver and the operculum is silver. The scales have tiny black dots and darker brown edges. The first part of the dorsal fin has a black upper part while the other fins are pale marked with tiny spots. This species has a maximum published total length of 30 cm (12 in) , although 20 cm (7.9 in) is more typical.

== Distribution and habitat ==
Johnius carutta is found in the Indian Ocean, and marginally in the Western Pacific Ocean. It extends from the Persian Gulf east to the Straits of Malacca. It is a demersal fish found at depths down to 40 m (130 ft) and lives in freshwaters, brackish waters and marine areas.

== Biology ==
Johnius carutta feeds on smaller fishes and invertebrates.

== Utilisation ==
Johnius carutta is of minor importance to fisheries and the catch is sold fresh or salted.
