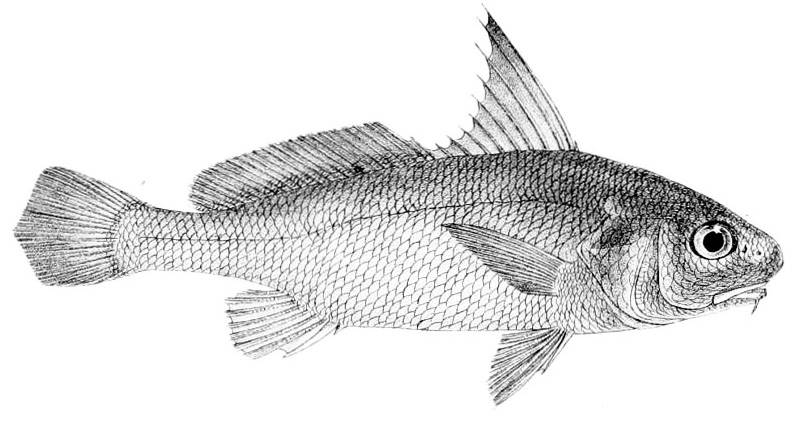
- Bearded croaker (Johnius amblycephalus)

Scientific classification
- Kingdom: Animalia
- Phylum: Chordata
- Class: Actinopterygii
- Order: Acanthuriformes
- Family: Sciaenidae
- Genus: Johnius; Bloch, 1793

Type species
- Johnius carutta Bloch, 1793

Synonyms
- Bola Hamilton, 1822; Apeches Gistel, 1848; Pseudomycterus Ogilby, 1908; Wak Lin, 1938; Blythia Talwar, 1971; Johnieops Lal Mohan, 1972; Blythsciaena Talwar, 1975

= Johnius =

Genus of fishes

Johnius is a genus of marine ray-finned fishes belonging to the family Sciaenidae, the drums and croakers. They are commonly known as croakers due to their ability to produce purring, croaking and knocking sounds. The sounds are produced mainly at night and are thought to be either involved in defense or for courtship.

== Taxonomy ==
The genus name was erected by Marcus Bloch in 1793 based on a specimen obtained from Tranquebar from Reverend Christoph Samuel John which was named as Johnius carutta. There are about 36 species in the genus, all within the Indo-West Pacific waters. This genus has been placed in the subfamily Otolithinae by some workers, but the 5th edition of Fishes of the World does not recognise subfamilies within the Sciaenidae which it places in the order Acanthuriformes.

Two subgenera are recognised within the genus Johnius, the nominate subgenus has an inferior mouth with the teeth on the lower jaw being uniform in size, although there may be a small number of molar-like teeth towards the rear of the jaw. They also have the teeth on the rear of the upper jaw relatively closely set. The subgenus Johnieops has a terminal or subterminal mouth with an inner row of enlarged teeth on the lower jaw and the outer teeth on the upper jaw are relatively widely spaced. The type species of Johnieops is Sciaena osseus Day, 1876. However, the two subgenera may not represent monophyletic groupings.

== Etymology ==
Johnius honours the Danish missionary Christoph Samuel John who collected specimens at Tranquebar for Bloch, presumed to include the types of Johnius carutta and Pennahia aneus.

== Species ==
Johnius includes 36 species, divided into two subgenera:

- Subgenus Johnieops
  - Johnius borneensis (Bleeker, 1851) (Sharpnose hammer croaker)
  - Johnius distinctus (Tanaka, 1916)
  - Johnius dorsalis (Peters, 1855) (Small kob)
  - Johnius dussumieri (Cuvier, 1830) (Sin croaker)
  - Johnius pacificus Hardenberg, 1941 (Pacific croaker)
  - Johnius philippinus Sasaki, 1999
  - Johnius plagiostoma (Bleeker, 1849) (Large-eye croaker)
- Subgenus Johnius
  - Johnius amblycephalus (Bleeker, 1855) (Bearded croaker)
  - Johnius australis (Günther, 1880) (Bottlenose jewfish)
  - Johnius belangerii (Cuvier, 1830) (Belanger's croaker)
  - Johnius cantori Bleeker, 1874
  - Johnius carouna (Cuvier, 1830) (Caroun croaker)
  - Johnius carutta Bloch, 1793 (Karut croaker)
  - Johnius coitor (Hamilton, 1822) (Coitor croaker)
  - Johnius elongatus Lal Mohan, 1976 (Spindle croaker)
  - Johnius fasciatus Chu, Lo & Wu, 1963
  - Johnius fuscolineatus (von Bonde, 1923) (Bellfish)
  - Johnius gangeticus Talwar, 1991
  - Johnius glaucus (Day, 1876) (Pale spotfin croaker)
  - Johnius goldmani (Bleeker, 1855)
  - Johnius grypotus (Richardson, 1846)
  - Johnius heterolepis Bleeker, 1873 (Large-scale croaker)
  - Johnius hypostoma (Bleeker, 1854) (Small-mouth croaker)
  - Johnius laevis Sasaki & Kailola, 1991 (Smooth croaker)
  - Johnius latifrons Sasaki, 1992 (Broad-head croaker)
  - Johnius macropterus (Bleeker, 1853) (Largefin croaker)
  - Johnius macrorhynus (Lal Mohan, 1976) (Big-snout croaker)
  - Johnius majan Iwatsuki, Jawad & Al-Mamry, 2012 (Majan croaker)
  - Johnius mannarensis Lal Mohan, 1971 (Mannar croaker)
  - Johnius novaeguineae (Nichols, 1950) (Paperhead croaker)
  - Johnius novaehollandiae (Steindachner, 1866)
  - Johnius sasakii Hanafi, Chen, Seah, Chang, Liu & Chao, 2022
  - Johnius taiwanensis Chao, Chang, Chen, Guo, Lin, Liou, Shen & Liu, 2019
  - Johnius trachycephalus (Bleeker, 1851) (Leaftail croaker)
  - Johnius trewavasae Sasaki, 1992 (Trewavas croaker)
  - Johnius weberi Hardenberg, 1936 (Weber's croaker)

Some authorities recognise Johnius sina as a valid species, while others treat it as a synonym of J. dussumieri.

== Characteristics ==
Johnius croakers are relatively small Scaienids, typically less than 30 cm (12 in). They have a characteristic hammer-shaped swim bladder with between 12 and 20 pairs of dendritic appendages along its sides. The first lateral appendage extends to the dorsal corner of the gill opening. They have large paired sagittal otoliths that are triangular. These fishes typically have a small mouth that is positioned sub-terminally to inferiorly. A few species have a short barbel on the chin but most species have no barbel on the chin. The largest species as J. dorsalis and J. dussumieri which both have a maximum published total length of 40 cm (16 in).

== Distribution ==
Johnius croakers are found in the Indo-Pacific region from eastern Africa to Australia and New Guinea.
