= Christoph Samuel John =

German missionary (1747–1813)

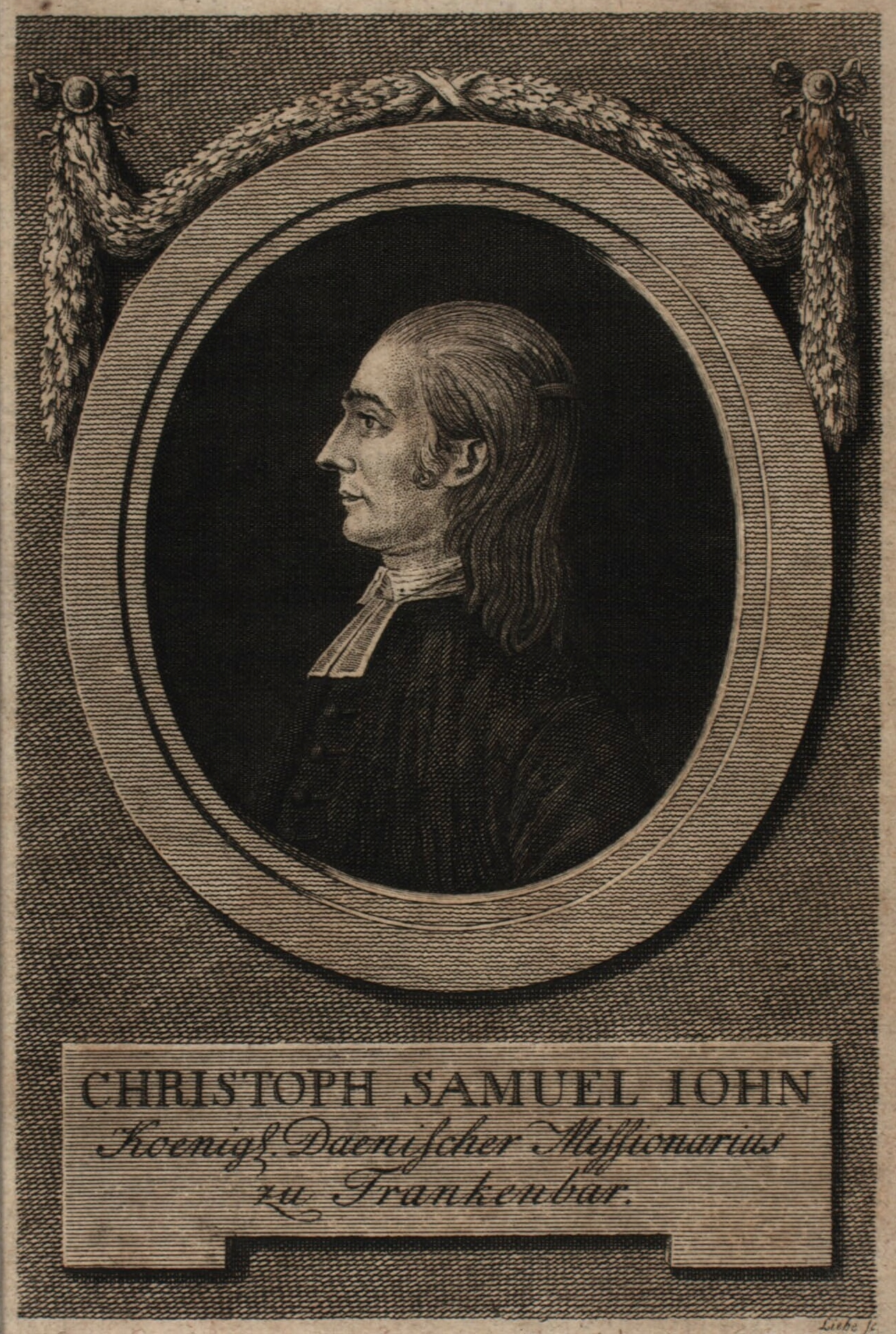
Profile engraving by Gottlob August Liebe (1746–1819)

Christoph Samuel John (11 August 1747 – 1 September 1813) was a German missionary in the service of the Danish-Halle Mission in southern India at the Danish settlement of Tranquebar (Tharangambadi). He promoted schools, natural theology, and collected specimens of local natural history which he sent to collaborators and several species have been named from his collections including the plant Impatiens johnii, the snake Eryx johnii and the fish genus Johnius and the species Lutjanus johnii.

== Life and work ==
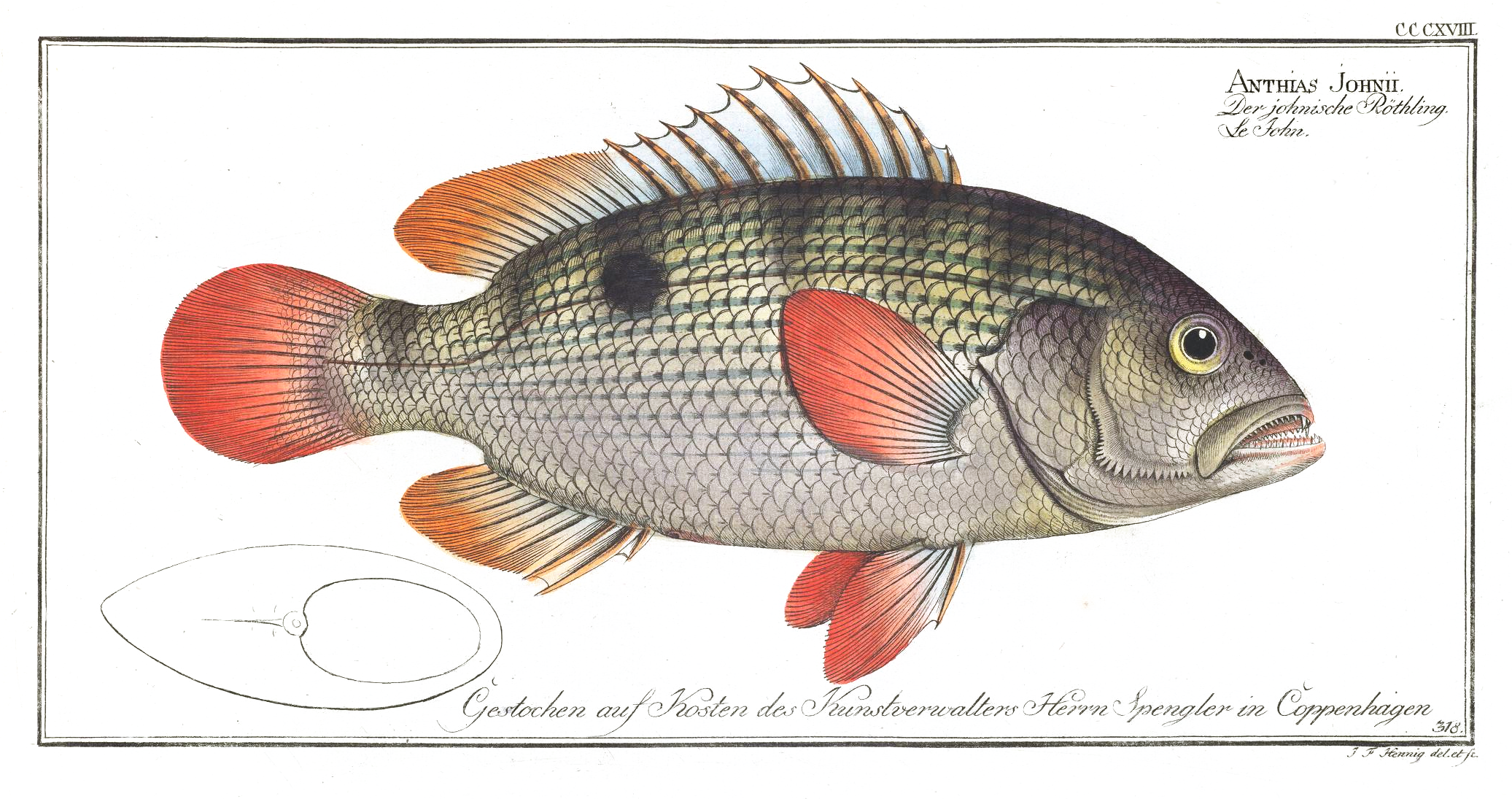
Anthias johnii

John was born in Frobersgrün near Greiz to priest Julius Gerhard (1708–1780) and Catharina Dorothea Pyrläus (c. 1710–1780). He studied theology at the university of Halle while also teaching at an orphanage under Johann Georg Knapp. He was ordained in 1769 at Copenhagen and went with the mission to Tranquebar along with Wilhelm Jacobus Müller, leaving on 16 March 1771 after a previous plan to sail on January 6, 1770, had to be cancelled due to winter ice.

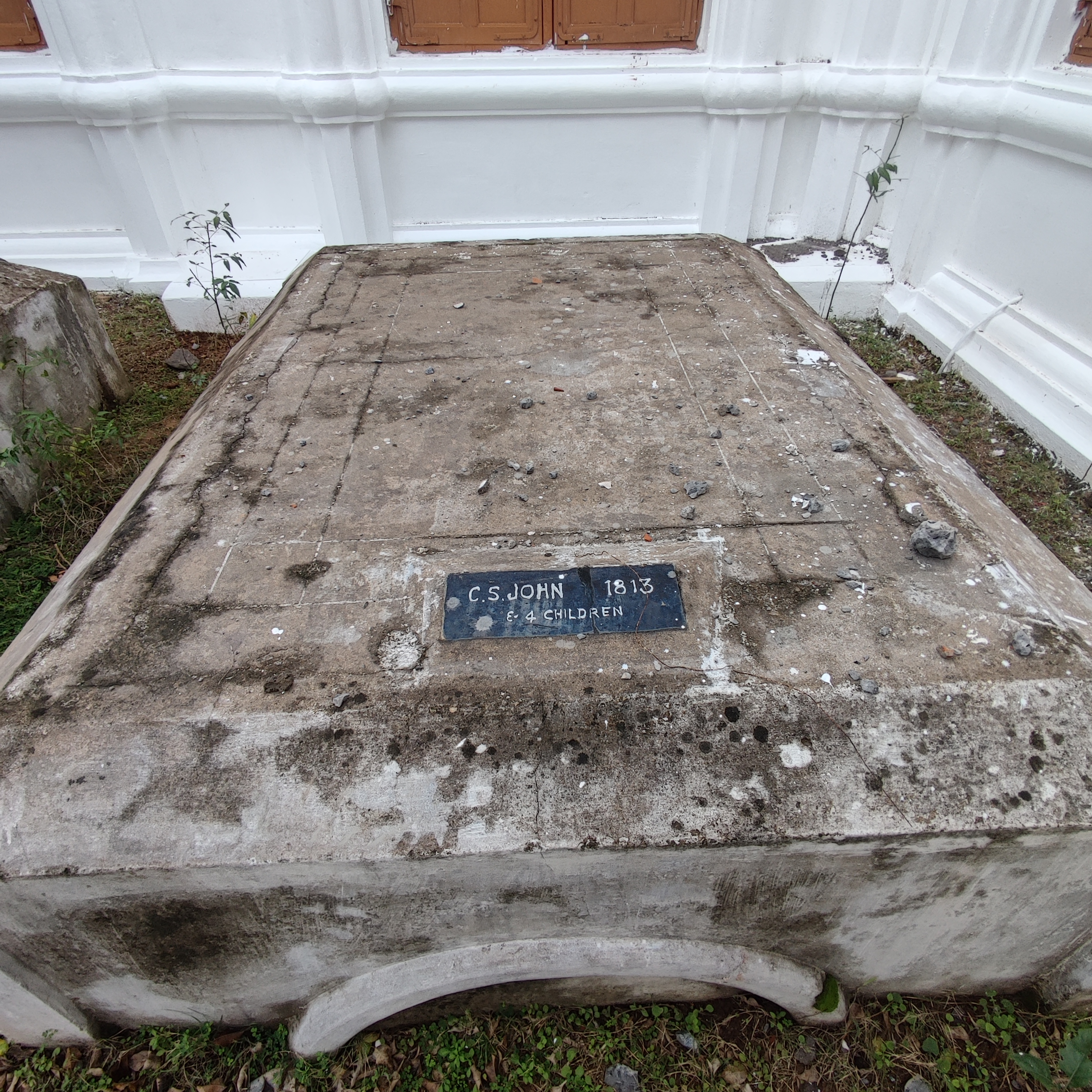
Grave of John in the New Jerusalem Church

In India he lived in poverty for a while and then began to follow the system of Serampore to be involved in education. He then became involved in establishing a school for the children of Europeans as well as one for Indians where the children paid for the education by working on plantations. The funding crunch was brought on by the clash between England and Denmark and John made use of local teachers. John was influenced into the study of natural history by Johann Gerhard König and began to collect specimens. He sent fishes, along with illustrations made by natives to Patrick Russell and to Marcus Élieser Bloch in Berlin. He began a botanical garden and sent plant specimens to William Roxburgh. He used sessions of observation under the microscope as part of his religious teaching. In 1770 he visited J. H. Chemnitz in Elsinore and corresponded with him subsequently. Chemnitz was a promoter of a form of natural theology known as testaceotheology or the use of molluscs for preaching. Patrick Russell named Eryx johnii and Bloch named Lutjanus johnii after him. The naturalist Heinrich Julius Lebeck (1772–1800), a former student of John, made two visits to Tranquebar. John called Lebeck as the crown of his former educational establishment and had Bloch name the fish Uranoscopus lebeck after him. John could speak English, Portuguese and Tamil apart from German. John fell afoul of many in the mission and faced much opposition to his involvement in education.

John married Christina Sophia Guldberg at Tranquebar on 27 November 1776. John suffered from blindness and lung disease and died of a stroke in Tranquebar and is buried at the New Jerusalem Cemetery.
