= Cnoll =

Cnoll is a surname. Notable people with the surname include:

- Pieter Cnoll (died 1672), Dutch merchant
- Samuel Benjamin Cnoll (1705–1767), German physician
