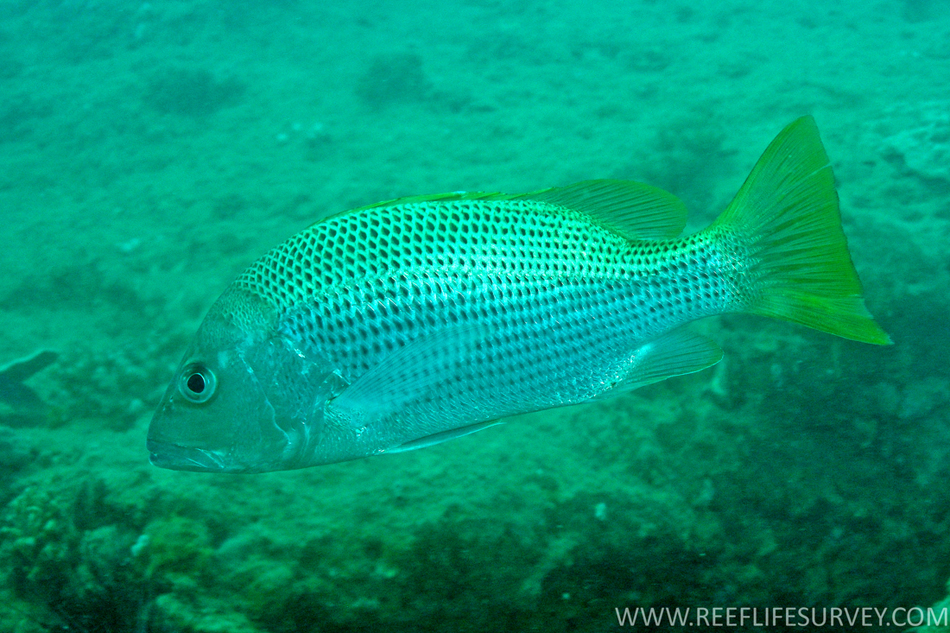

Conservation status
- Least Concern (IUCN 3.1)

Scientific classification
- Kingdom: Animalia
- Phylum: Chordata
- Class: Actinopterygii
- Order: Acanthuriformes
- Family: Lutjanidae
- Genus: Lutjanus
- Species: L. johnii

Binomial name
- Lutjanus johnii (Bloch, 1792)

Synonyms
- Anthias johnii Bloch, 1792; Sparus tranquebaricus Shaw, 1803; Coius catus Hamilton, 1822; Mesoprion yapilli Cuvier, 1828; Diacope xanthozona Kuhl, 1828; Serranus pavoninus Valenciennes, 1831

= Lutjanus johnii =

Species of fish

Lutjanus johnii, the Golden snapper, John's snapper, big-scaled bream, fingermark bream, fingermark seaperch, John's sea-perch, or spotted-scale sea perch is a species of marine ray-finned fish, a snapper belonging to the family Lutjanidae. It is native to the western Pacific and Indian Oceans.

== Taxonomy ==
Lutjanus johnii was first formally described in 1792 as Anthias johnii by the German naturalist Marcus Elieser Bloch with the type locality given as Surat where the Tapti River estuary meets the Gulf of Khambhat in the Arabian Sea. The specific name, johnii, honours the German naturalist Christoph Samuel John (1747–1813), who was a missionary in India from 1771 until his death and who collected specimens for Bloch at the Danish colony of Tranquebar.

== Description ==
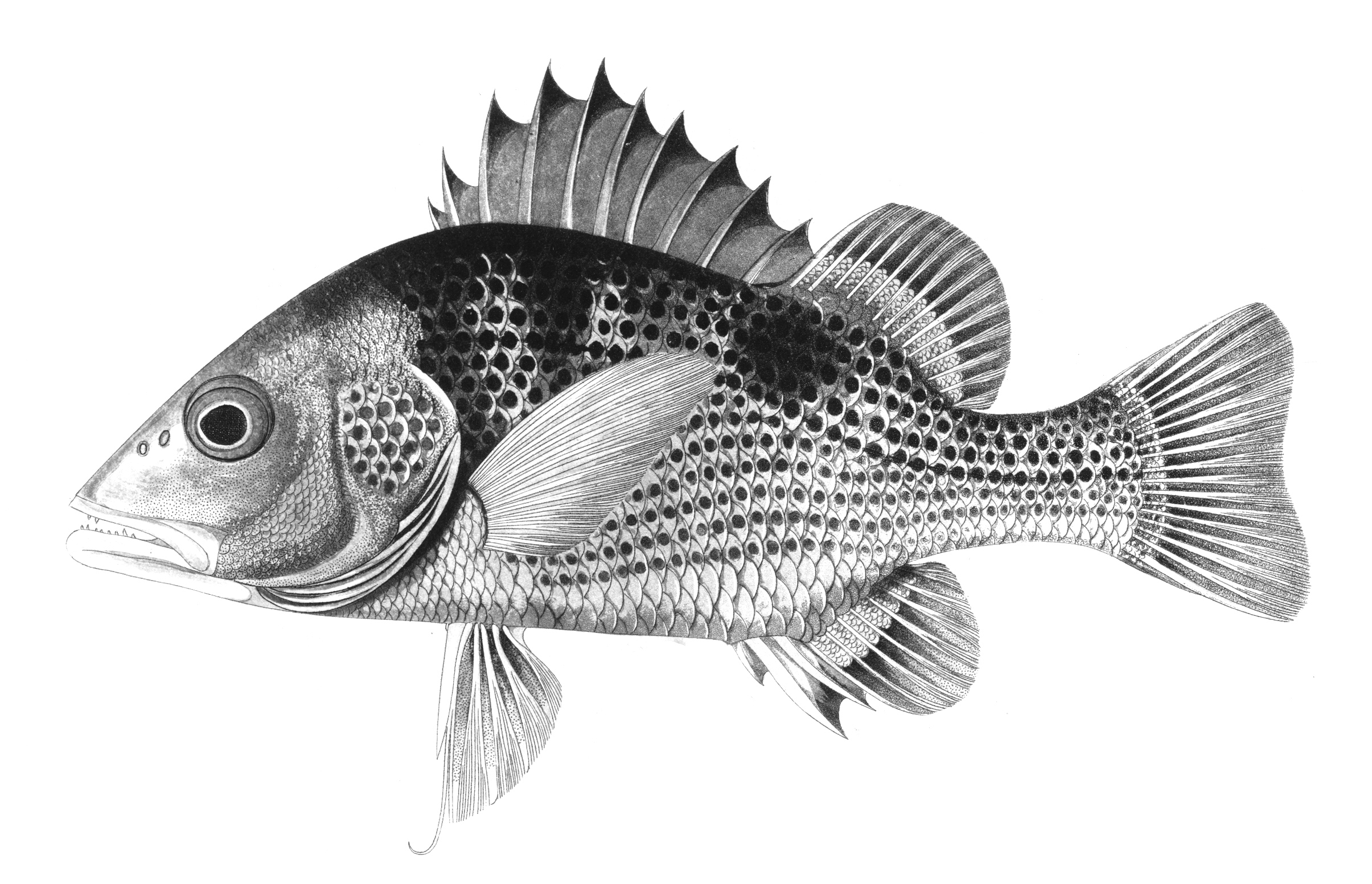

Lutjanus johnii has a moderately deep body in which its standard length is 2,4 to 2.9 its depth at the deepest point. It has a steeply sloped forehead and the incision and know on the preoperculum are weakly developed The vomerine teeth are arranged in a crescent shaped patch with no rearwards extension although there is a patch of granular teeth on the tongue. The dorsal fin has 10 spines and 13-14 soft rays while the anal fin has 3 spines and 8 soft rays. The soft part of the dorsal fin and the anal fin have a rounded shape. The pectoral fins have 16 or 17 rays and the caudal fin is truncate or weakly emarginate. This fish attains a maximum total length of 97 cm (38 in), although 50 cm (20 in) is more typical, and the maximum published weight is 10.5 kg (23 lb). The overall colour is yellow, with a sheen of bronze or silvery, becoming silvery-white on the abdomen. There is a rusty spot at the centre of each scale creating the appearance of horizontal lines along the flanks. There is a sizeable black blotch below the front of the soft rayed part of the dorsal fin which is mostly above the lateral line, although this may be absent in adults.

== Distribution and habitat ==
Lutjanus johnii has a wide Indo-Pacific distribution. It occurs from the eastern African coast where it ranges from the southern Red Sea to South Africa, across the Indian Ocean into the Pacific as far as Fiji. It is found as far north as the Ryukyu Islands of southern Japan and south to northern Australia. It has a depth range of 0.1 to 80 m (3.9 in to 262 ft 5.6 in). The adult fish are thought to be inhabitants of coral reefs while the juveniles use the shelter of mangroves.

== Biology ==
Lutjanus johnii is a predatory species which preys on fishes and benthic invertebrates such as crustaceans and cephalopods. Spawning has been observed during September in the Andaman Sea. It is more numerous over deep reefs than it is over reefs in shallower waters. In Australian waters L. johnii is one of the dominant, large snappers in the nearshore fish fauna of reefs. The large adults school in turbid waters around hard substrates in silty and sandy coastal and offshore areas.

== Fisheries ==
Lutjanus johnii is frequently recorded in markets throughout its range and is caught using handlines, bottom longlines, traps and bottom trawls. The catch is sold fresh or dried salted. it is a popular game fish for recreational anglers in Australia.
