= Samuel Benjamin Cnoll =

German physician

Samuel Benjamin Cnoll (1705 – 1767) was a German physician who worked in the Halle mission to Tranquebar. He was among the first to found a western-style pharmacy or Laboratorium Chymicum in India in 1732.

Cnoll studied medicine at Halle and joined the Danish-Halle mission around 1732 and went to Tranquebar where he succeeded Dr Caspar Schlegelmilch who died just two months into his work. Cnoll supervised the local mission hospital. He took an interest in borax which was a substance exported from India and published a description in Acta Medica Hafniensis. In order to find local botanical and other chemicals for use in treatments, as supplies from Europe were difficult to manage, he began to examine local plants of medical use. He began a botanical garden and worked along with Christoph Theodosius Walther and a network of locals. Cnoll also sought to make use of the Hortus Malabaricus but received no copy and had to work with other botanical sources. He was asked to examined if European medicines were effective and he noted that they had the same efficacy as in Europe. Cnoll was a member of the Royal Prussian Academy of Sciences in Berlin, possibly thanks to Johann Heinrich Pott who had a special interest in borax. After his death, Cnoll was succeeded by Johann Gerhard Koenig.
