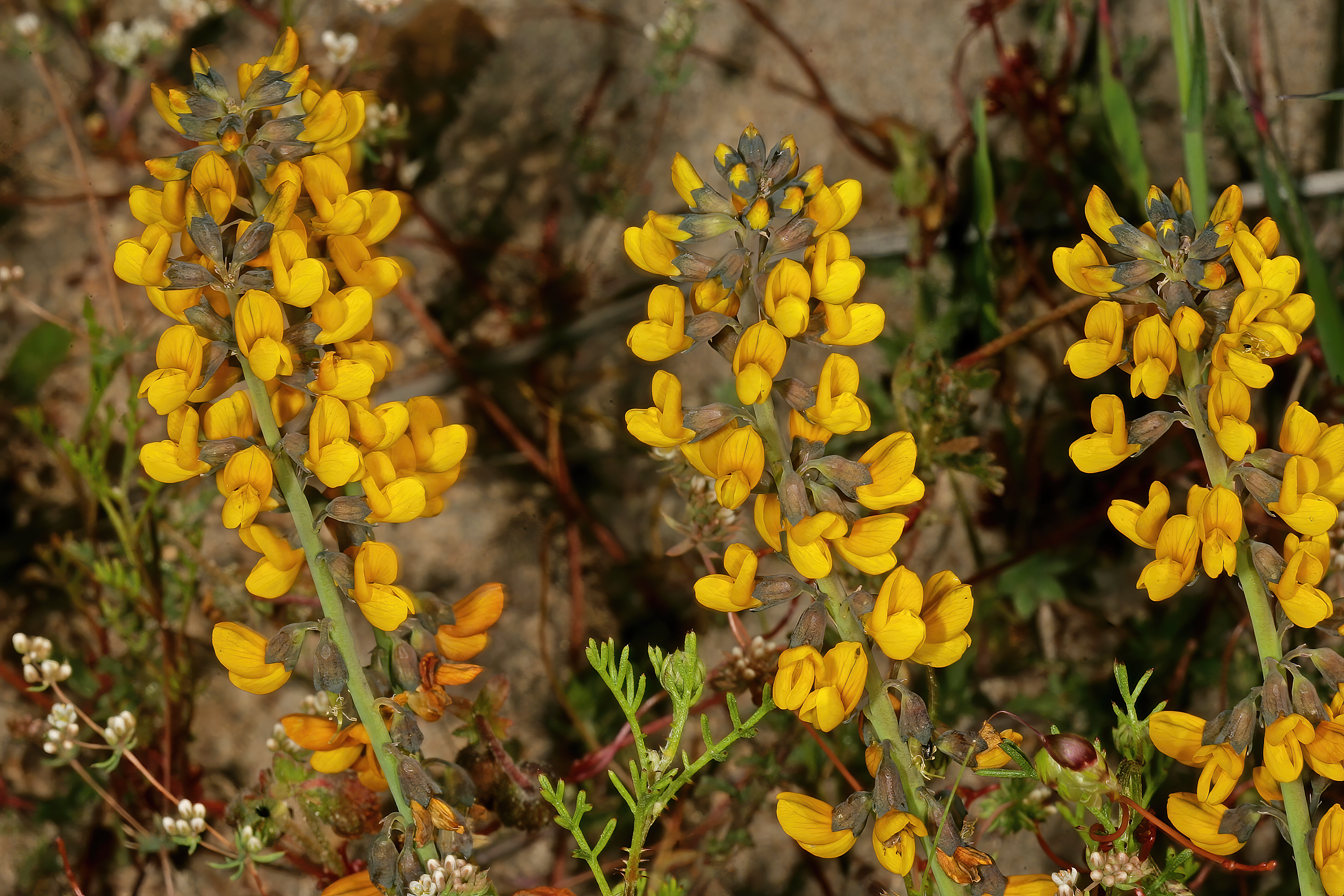

Conservation status
- Endangered (SANBI Red List)

Scientific classification
- Kingdom: Plantae
- Clade: Embryophytes
- Clade: Tracheophytes
- Clade: Spermatophytes
- Clade: Angiosperms
- Clade: Eudicots
- Clade: Rosids
- Order: Fabales
- Family: Fabaceae
- Subfamily: Faboideae
- Genus: Lebeckia
- Species: L. plukenetiana

Binomial name
- Lebeckia plukenetiana E.Mey.
- Distribution of Lebeckia plukenetiana in South Africa

Synonyms
- Lebeckia contaminata Eckl. & Zeyh. ex C.Presl

= Lebeckia plukenetiana =

Flowering plant endemic to the Western Cape

Lebeckia plukenetiana is a species of flowering plant in the genus Lebeckia. It is endemic to the Western Cape of South Africa.

== Distribution ==
Lebeckia plukenetiana was once found in the Swartland and upper Breede River Valley; ± 75% of its habitat has been lost to urban expansion and wheat, vineyard and deciduous fruit cultivation in the past 150 years. Its range is from Piquetberg down to Darling, Worcester and the Hex River to the Cape Peninsula.

== Conservation status ==
Lebeckia plukenetiana is classified as Endangered as it is in decline. It faces threats from invasive alien species, habitat loss, habitat degradation, harvesting of the plant and pollution.
