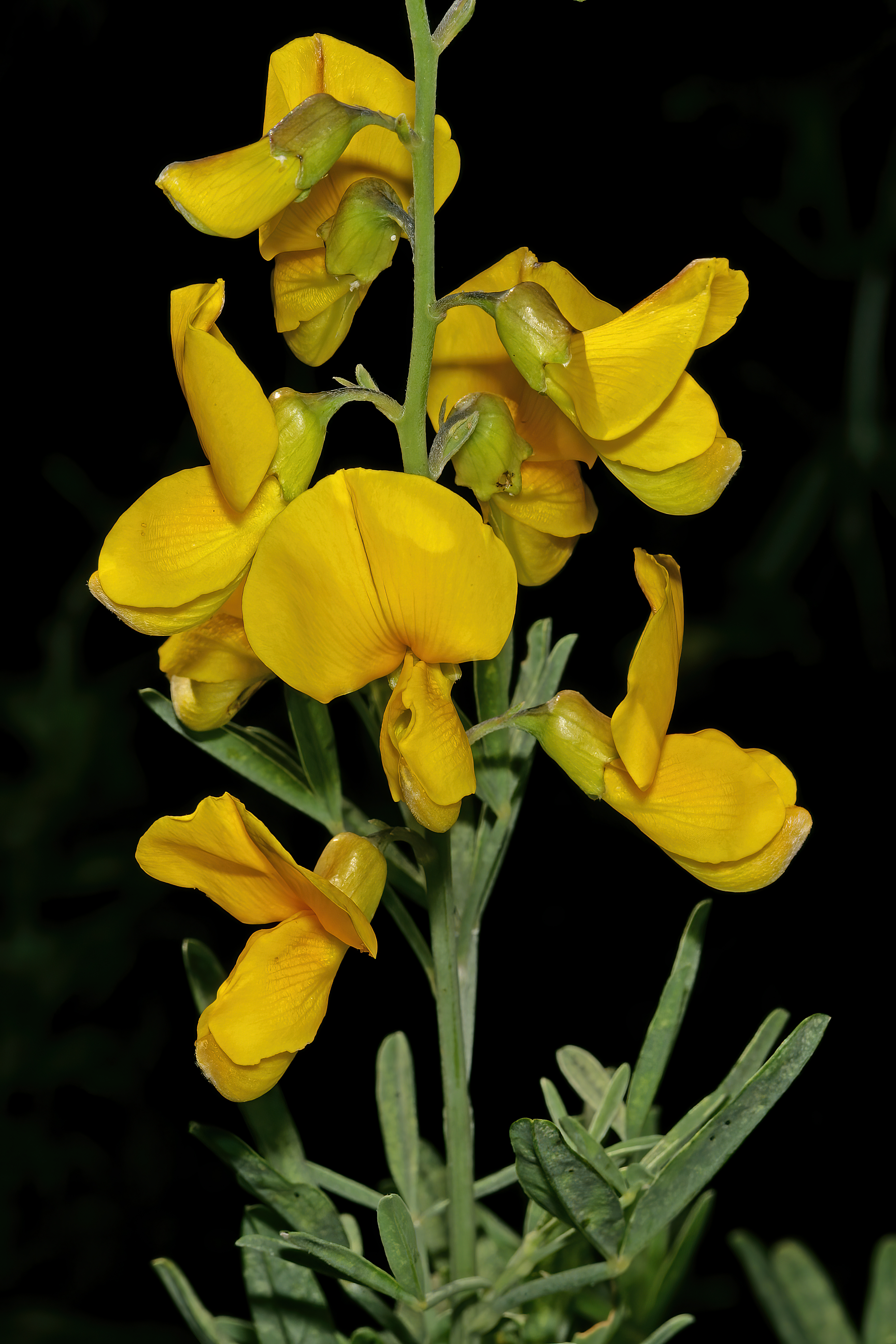
- Calobota cytisoides

Scientific classification
- Kingdom: Plantae
- Clade: Embryophytes
- Clade: Tracheophytes
- Clade: Spermatophytes
- Clade: Angiosperms
- Clade: Eudicots
- Clade: Rosids
- Order: Fabales
- Family: Fabaceae
- Subfamily: Faboideae
- Tribe: Crotalarieae
- Genus: Calobota; Eckl. & Zeyh. (1836)

Type species
- Calobota cytisoides (Berg.) Eckl. and Zeyh.

Species
- See text.

Synonyms
- Acanthobotrya Eckl. and Zeyh. (1836) pro parte; Lebeckia section Calobota (Eckl. and Zeyh.) Benth. pro parte majore; Lebeckia section Stiza (E.Mey.) Benth.; Spartidium Pomel (1874); Stiza E. Mey. (1835)

= Calobota =

Genus of legumes

Calobota is a genus of flowering plants in the legume family, Fabaceae. It includes 16 species native to North Africa (Morocco to Libya) and southern Africa (Namibia, Botswana, and Cape Provinces of South Africa). It belongs to the subfamily Faboideae.

== Species ==
Calobota comprises the following species:

- Calobota acanthoclada (Dinter) Boatwr. and B-E.Van Wyk
- Calobota angustifolia (E. Mey.) Boatwr. & B.-E. van Wyk
- Calobota cinerea (E. Mey.) Boatwr. & B.-E. van Wyk
- Calobota cuspidosa (Burch.) Boatwr. & B.-E. van Wyk
- Calobota cytisoides (Berg.) Eckl. and Zeyh.
- Calobota elongata (Thunb.) Boatwr. and B-E.Van Wyk
- Calobota halenbergensis (Merxm. & A.Schreib.) Boatwr. & B.-E. van Wyk
- Calobota linearifolia (E. Mey.) Boatwr. & B.-E. van Wyk
- Calobota lotononoides (Schltr.) Boatwr. and B-E.Van Wyk
- Calobota namibensis Boatwr. & B.-E.van Wyk
- Calobota obovata (Schinz) Boatwr. and B-E.Van Wyk
- Calobota psiloloba (E. Mey.) Boatwr. & B.-E. van Wyk
- Calobota pungens (Thunb.) Boatwr. & B.-E. van Wyk
- Calobota saharae (Coss. & Dur.) Boatwr. & B.-E. van Wyk
- Calobota sericea (Thunb.) Boatwr. & B.-E. van Wyk
- Calobota spinescens (Harv.) Boatwr. & B.-E. van Wyk
