= Calobota linearifolia =

Conservation status
- Least Concern (IUCN 3.1)

Scientific classification
- Kingdom: Plantae
- Clade: Tracheophytes
- Clade: Angiosperms
- Clade: Eudicots
- Clade: Rosids
- Order: Fabales
- Family: Fabaceae
- Subfamily: Faboideae
- Genus: Calobota
- Species: C. linearifolia

Binomial name
- Calobota linearifolia (E.Mey.) Boatwr. and B-E.Van Wyk

Synonyms
- Lebeckia linearifolia E.Mey.; Acanthobotrya linearifolia (E.Mey.) Benth.; Lebeckia dinteri Harms

Species of legume

Calobota linearifolia is a species of plant in the family Fabaceae. It can be found in Botswana, Namibia, and South Africa.

== Distribution and habitat ==
C. linearifolia can be found in Sperrgebiet and surrounds in Namibia, Kgalagadi District in Botswana, and Northern Cape Province in South Africa. It grows on alluvial soils and dunes.

== Description ==
C. linearifolia is an upright shrub growing to 3 m (9.8 ft) tall. The entire plant is covered with short, silvery grey hairs, and the simple leaves are attached directly to the stems. When flowering, the raceme bears 4-12 yellow flowers. The seed pods are straight and covered with fine hairs.
