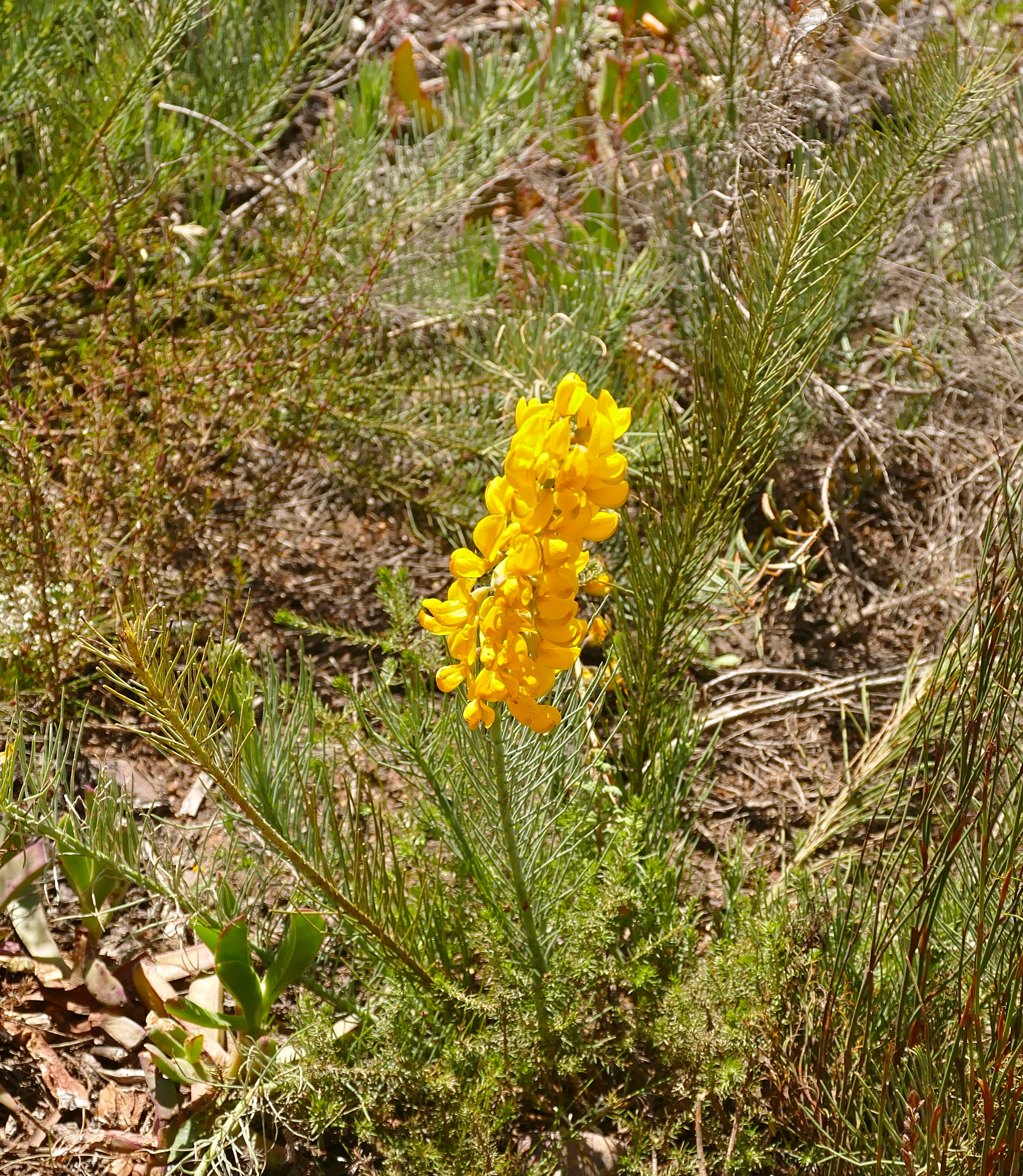
- Lebeckia sepiaria

Scientific classification
- Kingdom: Plantae
- Clade: Tracheophytes
- Clade: Angiosperms
- Clade: Eudicots
- Clade: Rosids
- Order: Fabales
- Family: Fabaceae
- Subfamily: Faboideae
- Tribe: Crotalarieae
- Genus: Lebeckia; Thunb. (1800)

Species
- 14; see text

= Lebeckia =

Genus of legumes

Lebeckia is a genus of plants in the family Fabaceae native to the fynbos (Cape Floristic Kingdom) of South Africa. Several members of Lebeckia were recently transferred to other genera (Calobota and Wiborgiella). Members of Lebeckia are known to produce pyrrolizidine alkaloids, including ammodendrine, lebeckianine, and lupanine. The genus was named by Carl Thunberg for his student Heinrich Julius Lebeck.

== Species ==
Lebeckia comprises the following species:

- Lebeckia ambigua E.Mey.
- Lebeckia brevicarpa M.M.le Roux & B.-E.van Wyk
- Lebeckia brevipes M.M.le Roux & B.-E.van Wyk
- Lebeckia contaminata (L.) Thunb.
- Lebeckia gracilis Eckl. & Zeyh.
- Lebeckia grandiflora Benth.
- Lebeckia longipes Bolus
- Lebeckia marginata E. Mey.
- Lebeckia meyeriana Eckl. and Zeyh.
- Lebeckia pauciflora Eckl. & Zeyh.
- Lebeckia plukenetiana E.Mey.
- Lebeckia schlechteriana Schinz (unplaced)
- Lebeckia sepiaria (L.) Thunb.
- Lebeckia uniflora B.-E.van Wyk & M.M.le Roux
- Lebeckia wrightii (Harv.) Bolus
- Lebeckia zeyheri M.M.le Roux & B.-E.van Wyk
