= Lebeckia ambigua =

Scientific classification
- Kingdom: Plantae
- Clade: Embryophytes
- Clade: Tracheophytes
- Clade: Spermatophytes
- Clade: Angiosperms
- Clade: Eudicots
- Clade: Rosids
- Order: Fabales
- Family: Fabaceae
- Subfamily: Faboideae
- Genus: Lebeckia
- Species: L. ambigua

Binomial name
- Lebeckia ambigua E.Mey.
- Distribution of Lebeckia ambigua in South Africa

Species of legume

Lebeckia ambigua is a species of flowering plant in the family Fabaceae. The species is native to South Africa, around Saldanha Bay and Clanwilliam.
