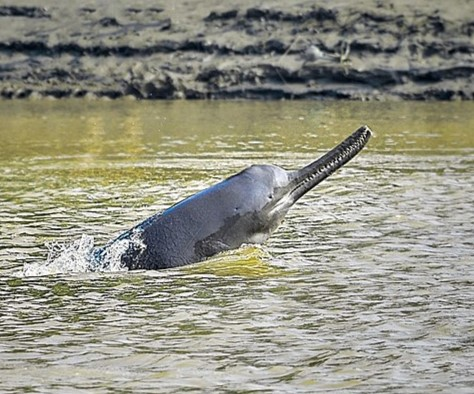

- Size compared to an average human

Conservation status
- Endangered (IUCN 3.1)
- CITES Appendix I

Scientific classification
- Kingdom: Animalia
- Phylum: Chordata
- Class: Mammalia
- Order: Artiodactyla
- Infraorder: Cetacea
- Family: Platanistidae
- Genus: Platanista
- Species: P. gangetica

Binomial name
- Platanista gangetica (Lebeck, 1801)
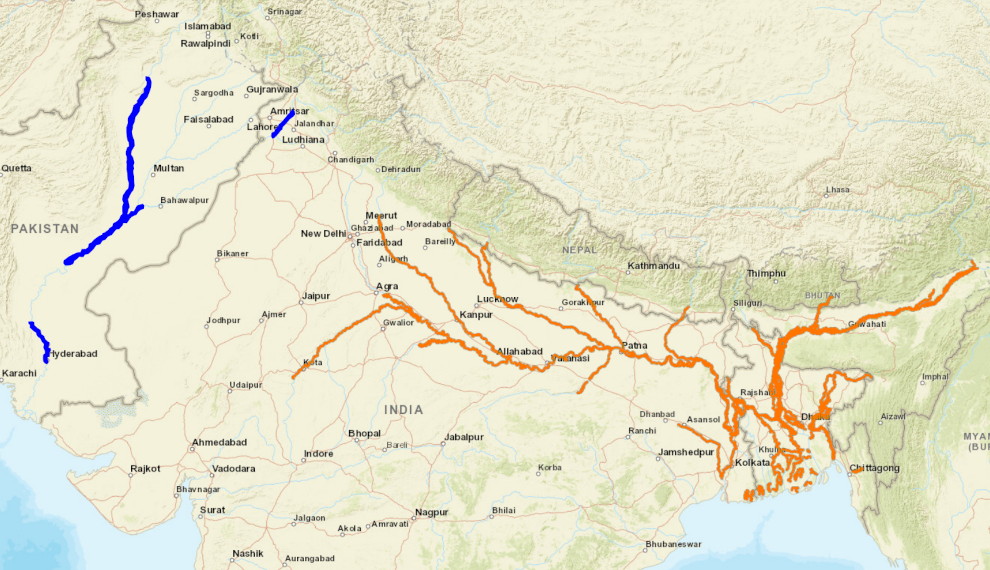
- Ranges of the Indus river dolphin and Ganges river dolphin

Synonyms
- Platanista gangetica gangetica

= Ganges river dolphin =

Ganges river dolphin Temporal range: 0.012–0 Ma Early Holocene – present

Species of toothed whale

The Ganges river dolphin (Platanista gangetica) is a freshwater dolphin in the family Platanistidae. It lives in the Ganges and related rivers of South Asia, namely in the countries of India, Nepal, and Bangladesh. It is also known by the names Xihu (Assamese: শিহু, pronounced [xiɦu]) in Assam, Shushuk (Bengali: শুশুক, pronounced [ʃuʃuk]) in West Bengal and Bangladesh, and Uttum (Chittagonian: উত্তুম, pronounced [ut̪ːum]) in Chittagong region.

The Ganges river dolphin has been recognized by the Government of India as its National Aquatic Animal and is the official animal of the Indian city of Guwahati. Its first occurrence, within the Hooghly River, was documented by William Roxburgh.

== Description ==
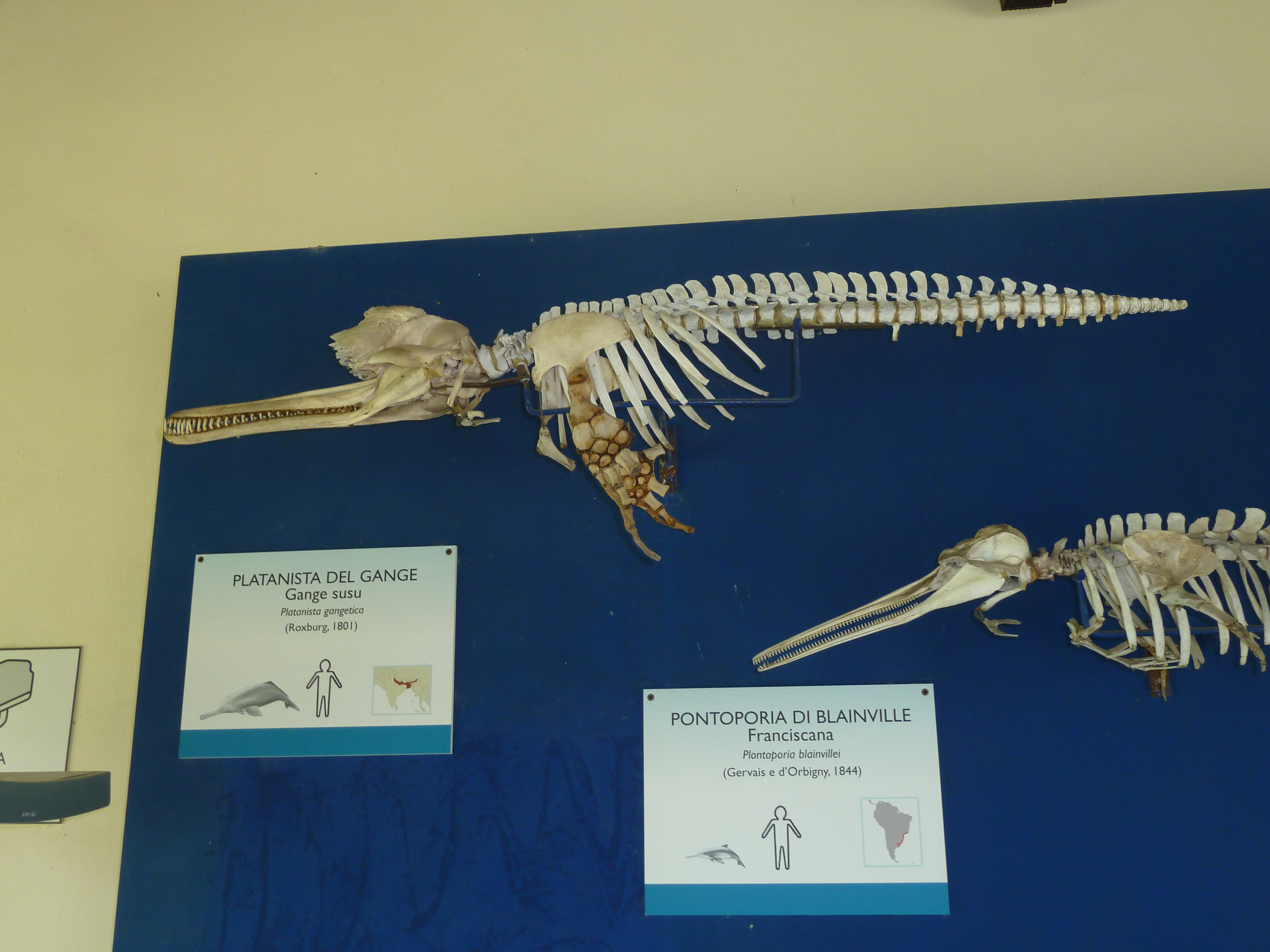
Ganges river dolphin skeleton specimen exhibited in Museo di storia naturale e del territorio dell'Università di Pisa

The Ganges river dolphin has a rectangular, ridgelike dorsal fin and females tend to be larger than males. Ganges river dolphins usually are tan, chocolate brown, dark grey or light blue. They have an elongated, slender snout with sharp and very pointed teeth, similar to most river dolphins. The river dolphin has a rounded belly, which, combined with its rectangular dorsal fin, makes it look particularly stocky in build compared to other dolphins. Their flippers and tail flukes are large and broad. They have a large melon head used for echolocation, because they cannot see well. Their eyes are usually small due to the cloudy water. Ganges river dolphins are usually 2.2–2.6 meters long (7–8 ft). The oldest recorded animal was a 28-year-old male, 199 cm in length, although they are estimated to live up to 30 years old.

== Taxonomy ==
The Ganges river dolphin was formally classified as Delphinus gangeticus two separate times in 1801 by Heinrich Julius Lebeck and William Roxburgh. They both likely used the type specimen, caught near Calcutta in late 1797 and sent to the Hunterian Museum in London. It may have been destroyed during World War II, but castings were previously made of the rostrum and parts of the lower jaw, which survive at the Natural History Museum. Whether Lebeck or Roxburgh should be given credit has been debated over the centuries; since Lebeck's description was published on 24 August while Roxburgh's was likely published only in September, Lebeck should be given priority.

The Ganges river dolphin and the Indus river dolphin were initially classified as a single species, Platanista gangetica, but in the 1970s both were split into distinct species. However, in the 1990s, both species were again grouped as a single species. However, studies of genes, divergence time, and skull structure support both being distinct species. It is estimated to have split from the Indus river dolphin during the Pleistocene around 550,000 years ago; the earliest fossil identified as belonging to the species is about 12,000 years old.

== Etymology ==
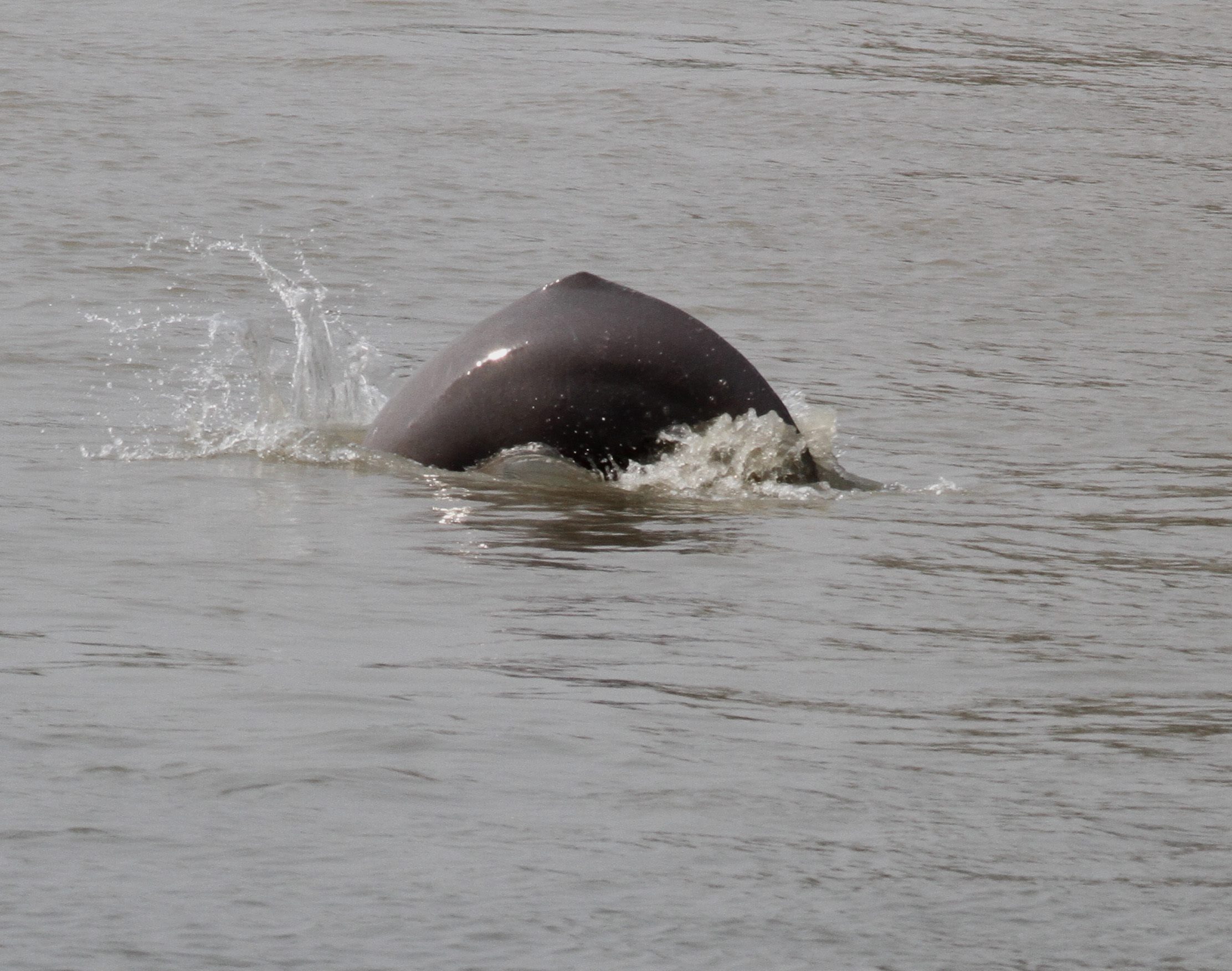
In Sundarbans, Bangladesh

The species has multiple common names throughout its range. It is known as susu as a popular name, soons, soans, or soos in Hindi, shushuk in Bengali, hiho or hihu in Assamese, bhagirath (as a reference to the character of the same name from Hindu mythology), and shus or suongsu in Nepali. Its Sanskrit name in medieval times was likely shishumar, and during the Mughal era, it was known as pani suar.

== Distribution ==
The Ganges river dolphin lives along the Ganges-Brahmaputra-Meghna and Karnaphuli-Sangu river systems of Bangladesh and India, and the Sapta Koshi and Karnali Rivers in Nepal. The Ganges river dolphin favours deep pools, eddy countercurrents located downstream of the convergence of rivers and of sharp meanders, and upstream and downstream of midchannel islands.

A 2025 survey revealed 6,324 Ganges river dolphins in India, with 3,275 individuals in the mainstream of the Ganges and 2,414 in its tributaries. About 584 live in the Brahmaputra mainstream and 51 in its tributaries.

== Behaviour ==
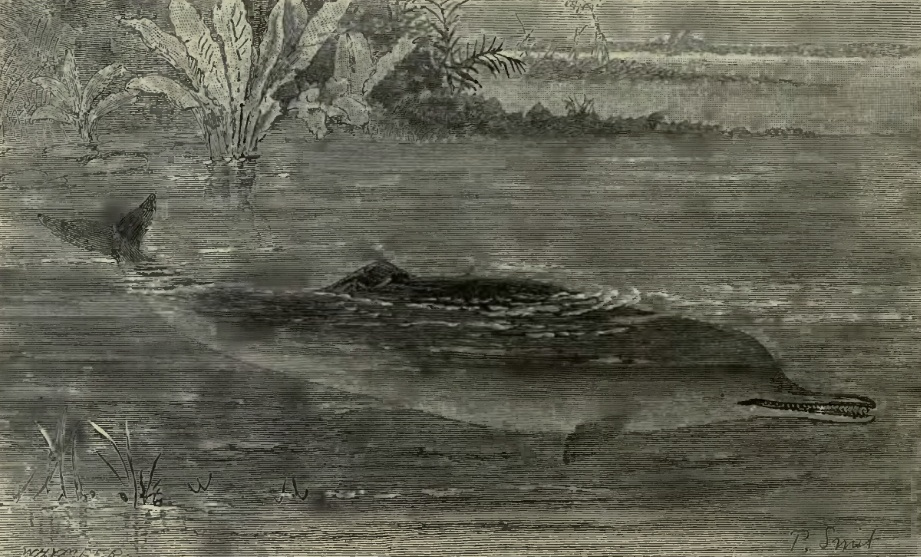
Gangetic dolphin, 1894 book illustration

The Ganges river dolphins usually swim alone or in pairs, they are known to breach rarely and are shy around boats and therefore difficult to observe.

=== Vocalization ===
This species shows object-avoidance behavior in both the consistently heavily murky waters of its habitat and in clear water in captivity, suggesting it is capable of using echolocation effectively to navigate and forage for prey. Information is limited on how extensively vocalization is used between individuals. It is capable of performing whistles, but rarely does so, suggesting that the whistle is a spontaneous sound and not a form of communication. The Ganges river dolphin most typically makes echolocation sounds such as clicks, bursts, and twitters. Produced pulse trains are similar in wave form and frequency to the echolocation patterns of the Amazon river dolphin. Both species regularly produce frequencies lower than 15 kHz and the maximum frequency is thought to fall between 15 and 60 kHz.

Echolocation is also used for population counts by using acoustic surveying. This method is still being developed and is not heavily used due to cost and technical skill requirement. Given the dolphin's blindness, it produces an ultrasonic sound that is echoed off other fish and water species, allowing it to identify prey.

=== Reproduction ===
The Ganges river dolphin does not have a specific mating season. When a calf is born, 8–12 months after conception, it stays with its mother for one year.

=== Diet ===
The Ganges river dolphin finds food through echolocation and feeds on crustaceans such as prawns and fish including carp, mahseer, and even sharks such as the Ganges shark (Glyphis gangeticus). It also takes birds and turtles.

== Threats ==
The Ganges river dolphin has been listed as an Endangered species on the IUCN Red List since 1996. It is threatened by habitat fragmentation due to reduced dry-season river flows, entanglement in fishing gear and by-catch mortality, targeted hunting, pollution of rivers in proximity to urban areas and intensive agricultural landscapes; it is disturbed by inland navigation and potentially threatened by seismic surveys, oil well blowouts, and the effects of climate change on hydrological dynamics. Human activity has played a large role in the reduction of its native range and population size due to stressors such as noise pollution, ship traffic and fishery bycatch, construction of dams and hydroelectric power plants. It is also endangered due to pollution and overfishing for oil. Entanglement in fishing nets as bycatch can cause significant damage to local populations, and individuals are taken each year by hunters; their oil and meat are used as a liniment, as an aphrodisiac, and as bait for catfish. Poisoning of the water supply by industrial and agricultural chemicals may also have been a contributing factor towards population decline, as these chemicals are biomagnified in the bodies of the dolphins. An immediate danger in National Chambal Sanctuary is the decrease in river depth and appearance of sand bars dividing the river course into smaller segments.

== Conservation ==
The Ganges river dolphin is protected from international trade by its listing in Appendix I of the Convention on International Trade in Endangered Species of Wild Fauna and Flora. This makes commercial international trade prohibited. The Uttar Pradesh government is propagating ancient Hindu texts to raise the community support to save the Ganges river dolphin. One of the lines being versed from Valimiki's Ramayana, highlighted the force by which the Ganges emerged from Shiva's locks and along with this force came many species such as animals, fish, and the Shishumaar—the dolphin. On 20 May 2013, India's Ministry of Environment and Forests declared dolphins 'nonhuman persons' and as such has forbidden their captivity for entertainment purposes; keeping dolphins in captivity must satisfy certain legal prerequisites.

On 31 December 2020, a dead adult dolphin was found at the Sharda canal in the Pratapgarh district in India. A video circulated on social media showing a dozen men beating the dolphin with sticks and an axe. On 7 January 2021, three people were arrested. Similarly, there is another news story in which a few fishermen caught one Gangetic dolphin and feasted upon it, leading to their arrest by Kaushambhi police in Uttar Pradesh.

Bangladesh has established six sanctuaries in the Sundarbans.

=== Project Dolphin ===
On the occasion of the 74th Independence Day on 15 August 2020, the Indian Ministry of Environment, Forest and Climate Change announced 'Project Dolphin' to boost conservation of both river and oceanic dolphins.

== In culture ==
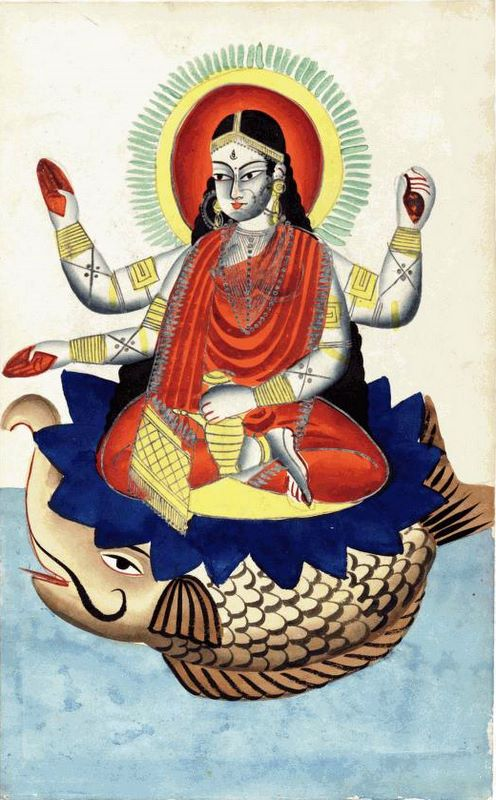
Ganga on a makara by Kalighat (1875)

The Ganges dolphin is associated with Ganga and is occasionally the depiction of her vahana, the makara.
