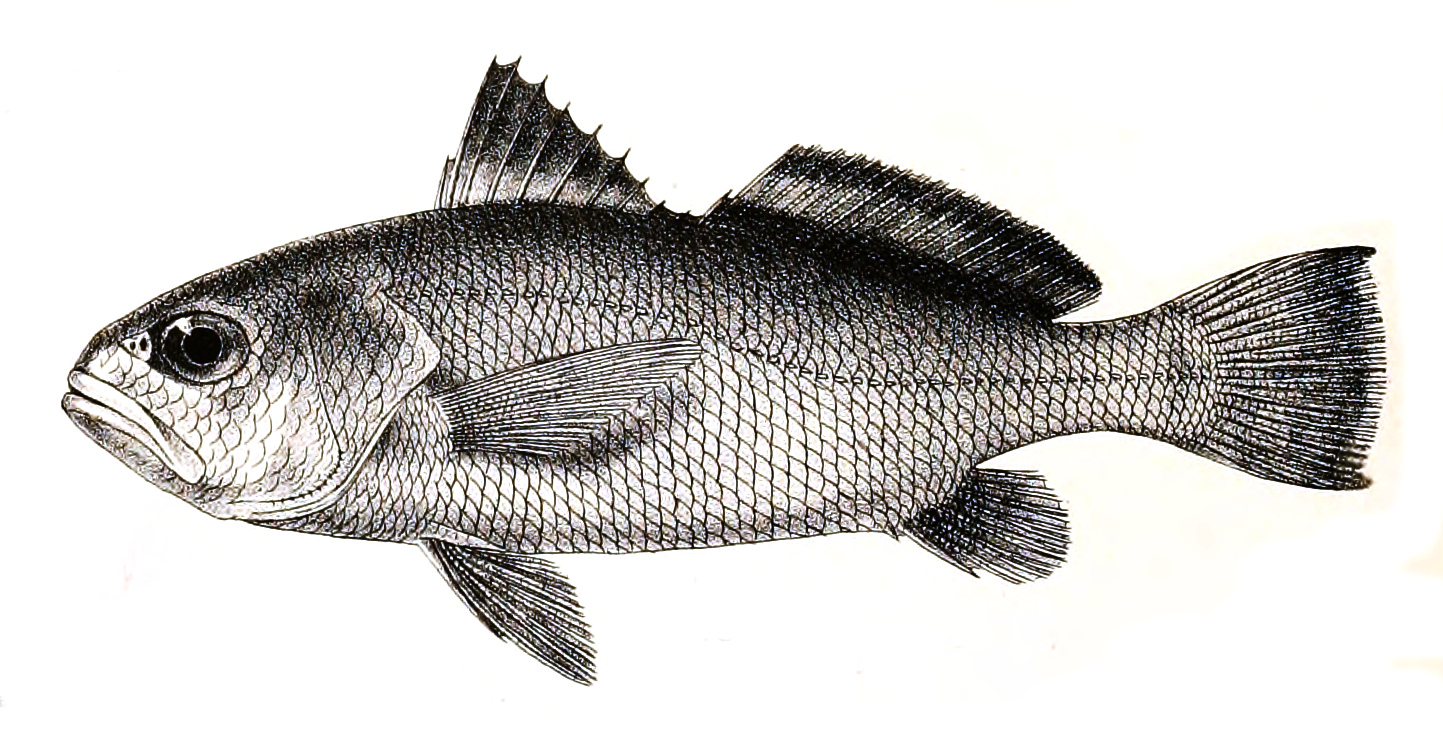

Conservation status
- Least Concern (IUCN 3.1)

Scientific classification
- Kingdom: Animalia
- Phylum: Chordata
- Class: Actinopterygii
- Order: Acanthuriformes
- Family: Sciaenidae
- Genus: Pennahia
- Species: P. aneus

Binomial name
- Pennahia aneus (Bloch, 1793)

Synonyms
- Johnius aneus Bloch, 1793; Argyrosomus aneus (Bloch, 1793); Johnieops aneus (Bloch, 1793); Pseudosciaena aneus (Bloch, 1793); Sciaena aneus (Bloch, 1793); Otolithus macrophthalmus Bleeker, 1849; Corvina macrophthalmus (Bleeker, 1849); Pennahia macrophthalmus (Bleeker, 1849); Pseudosciaena macrophthalmus (Bleeker, 1849); Sciaena macrophthalmus (Bleeker, 1849); Johnius resplendens Hombron & Jacquinot, 1853; Otolithus leuciscus Günther, 1872

= Pennahia aneus =

Species of ray-finned fish

Pennahia aneus, the bigeye croaker, monkey croaker or greyfin croaker, is a species of marine ray-finned fish belonging to the family Sciaenidae, the drums and croakers. This species is found in the Indo-West-Pacific region.
