= Christoph Theodosius Walther =

German Lutheran missionary

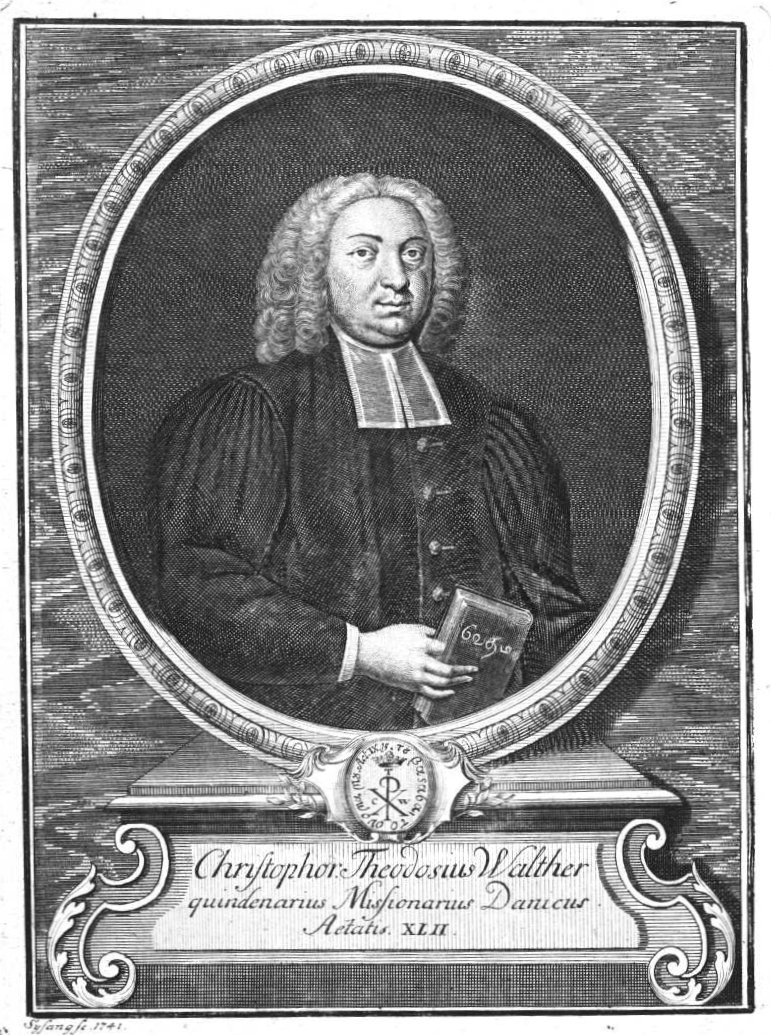

Christoph Theodosius Walther (20 December 1699 – 29 April 1741) was a German Lutheran missionary who worked in the Danish Halle Mission in Tranquebar, southern India where he took an interest in the Tamil language and the local plants.

Walther was born in Shildberg near Soldin in West Pomerania in a family of protestant preachers. He was educated at Schönfliess and Königsberg in Neumark before going to Stargard, Pomerania in 1715. He studied at the Gröningisches Collegium where he studied under Christian Schöttgen (1687–1751). He joined the Halle orphanage in 1720. He went to Tranquebar as part of the Danish Halle Mission leaving Halle on December 8, 1724 to Rotterdam, and then to London where he met members of the Society for Promoting Christian Knowledge. They left on February 15, 1725 and reached Tranquebar on June 19, 1725. Walther learned Portuguese and later began to study Tamil. He gave himself the Tamil name of Njanaawâlutâr or "strengthener of knowledge". He married Anna Christina Brochmann, daughter of a Danish administrator on December 21, 1728. She died in 1735 following childbirth. In 1739–1740 he returned to Europe and went to Halle and died at Dresden.

While posted in Tranquebar, he undertook a project to document the plants of the region and began the Herbarium Trangambariense (1743) collecting Tamil names and documenting the usage of plants.
