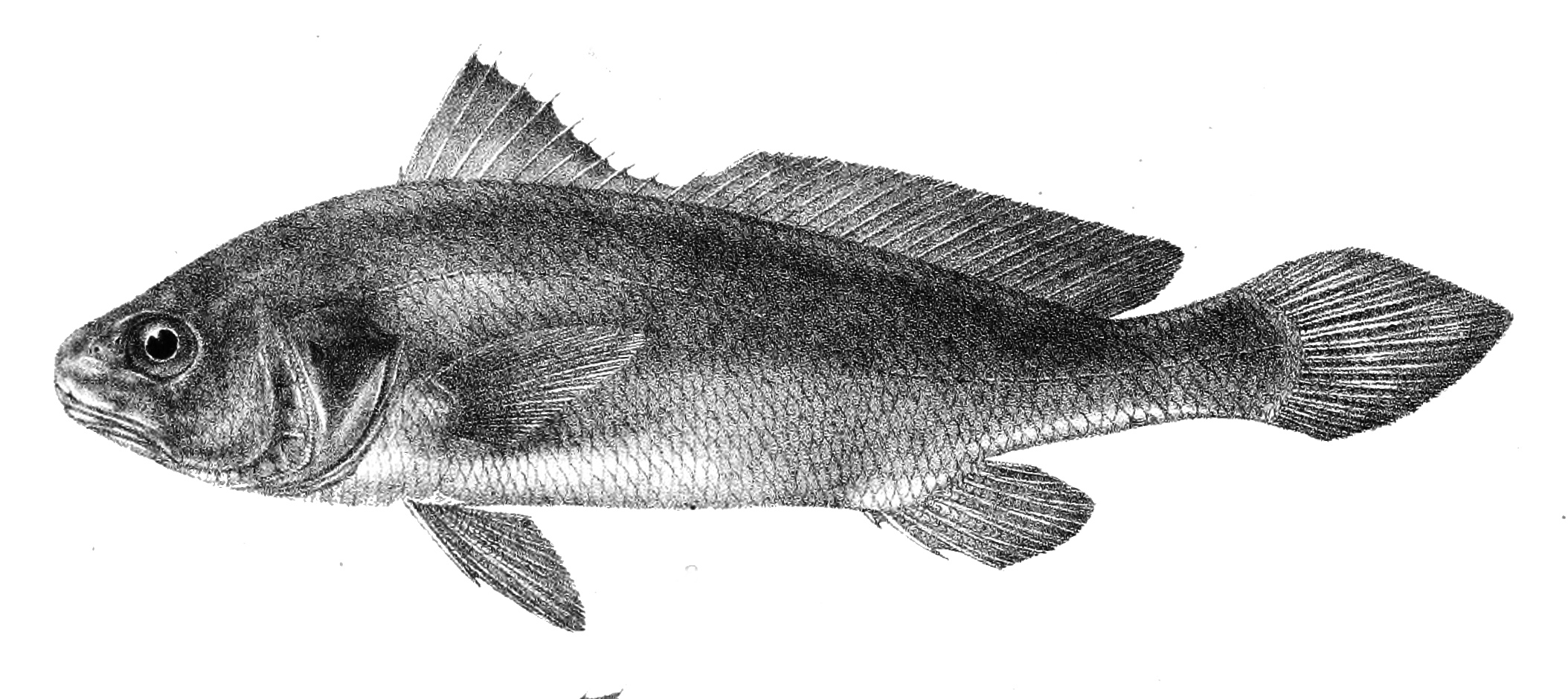

Conservation status
- Least Concern (IUCN 3.1)

Scientific classification
- Kingdom: Animalia
- Phylum: Chordata
- Class: Actinopterygii
- Order: Acanthuriformes
- Family: Sciaenidae
- Genus: Johnius
- Subgenus: Johnius (Johnieops)
- Species: J. dussumieri

Binomial name
- Johnius dussumieri (Cuvier, 1830)

Synonyms
- Corvina dussumieri Cuvier, 1830; Johnieops dussumieri (Cuvier, 1830); Sciaena dussumieri (Cuvier, 1830); Corvina sina Cuvier, 1830; Johnieops sina (Cuvier, 1830); Johnius sina (Cuvier, 1830); Pseudosciaena sina (Cuvier, 1830); Sciaena sina (Cuvier, 1830); Wak sina (Cuvier, 1830); Sciaena ossea Day, 1876; Wak osseus (Day, 1876); Wak menoni Talwar & Joglekar, 1970

= Johnius dussumieri =

Species of fish

Johnius dussumieri, the sin croaker, Dussumier's croaker, Dussumier's silver jewfish, sharptooth hammer croaker or whiskered croaker, is a marine ray-finned fish belonging to the family Sciaenidae, the drums and croakers. This fish is found in the Indian Ocean.

== Taxonomy ==
Johnius dussumieri was first formally described as Corvina dussumieri by the French biologist Georges Cuvier with its type locality given as Malabar in India. This species is classified within the subgenus Johnieops, one of two subgenera in the genus Johnius, of which it is the type species, as Sciaena osseus. However, the two subgenera may not represent monophyletic groupings. Some authorities recognise Johnius sina as a valid species, while others treat it as a synonym of J. dussumieri. This species has been placed in the subfamily Otolithinae by some workers, but the 5th edition of Fishes of the World does not recognise subfamilies within the Sciaenidae which it places in the order Acanthuriformes.

== Etymology ==
Johnius dussumieri has a specific name that honours the French merchant and voyager Jean-Jacques Dussumier on whose account of this species Cuvier based his formal description.

== Description ==
Johnius dussumieri has a deeply incised dorsal fin, the part of the dorsal fin anterior to the incision is supported by between 9 and 11 spines and the part to the rear of the incision is supported by a single spine and between 27 and 30 soft rays. The anal fin contains 2 spines and 7 soft rays. The standard length of the body is 3.2 to 4.3 times its depth. They have a blunt, rounded snout when seen from above. The teeth in the lower jaw are all the same size. The outer row of teeth in the upper jaw are enlarged but there are no very large teeth in the front of the jaw. There are no scales on the part of the dorsal fin in front of the incision. This species is greyish on the back, silvert with a golden sheen on the flanks and underside. The outer part of the spiny part of the dorsal fin is dusky with the other fins being yellowish. This species has a maximum published total length of 40 cm (16 in) , although 14 cm (5.5 in) is more typical.

== Distribution and habitat ==
Johnius dussumieri is found in the Indian Ocean from Pakistan east to the north western part of Peninsular Malaysia. It is found at depths down to 40 m (130 ft) in coastal waters, including estuaries and the mouths of rivers.

== Utilisation ==
Johnius dussumieri is caught mainly as bycatch in trawl and gill net fisheries. The catch is sold fresh or dries or as fish meal.
