= Johnius fuscolineatus =

Conservation status
- Least Concern (IUCN 3.1)

Scientific classification
- Kingdom: Animalia
- Phylum: Chordata
- Class: Actinopterygii
- Order: Acanthuriformes
- Family: Sciaenidae
- Genus: Johnius
- Subgenus: Johnius (Johnius)
- Species: J. fuscolineatus

Binomial name
- Johnius fuscolineatus (von Bonde, 1923)

Synonyms
- Umbrina fuscolineata von Bonde, 1923; Dendrophysa fuscolineata (von Bonde, 1923)

Species of fish

Johnius fuscolineatus, the bellfish or African bearded croaker, is a species of marine ray-finned fish belonging to the family Sciaenidae, the drums and croakers. This species is found in the southwestern Indian Ocean.
