= Johan Peter Rottler =

French missionary and botanist

Johan Peter Rottler (June 1749 – 24 January 1836) was a Dutch missionary and botanist, most associated with the Danish Mission in Tranquebar and later Vepery, Chennai in southern India.

He was born in Strasbourg, France in 1749, and studied at the local Gymnasium from the age of nine. He was influenced by the master of the school Dr Lorenz . In 1766 he joined the University of Strasbourg and studied for nine years. He was ordained, and went as a missionary to southern India in 1776 at the recommendation of Dr Freylinghausen of Halle. His first appointment along with Johann Wilhelm Gerlach was at the Danish Lutheran Tranquebar Mission at Tranquebar; in 1806, he moved to an English mission in Madras, where he died in 1836.

Continuing the work of earlier naturalists in the region including Johann Gerhard König, Rottler became an enthusiastic botanist, who collected more than 2000 plant samples from southern India and sent them to Europe for study and research. Rottler also studied the Tamil language and compiled a dictionary. He married a Dutch lady, a widow of a Dutch ship captain, in 1779 and who died in Vepery in 1827 from cancer. He corresponded with Dr Schreber at the University of Erlangen and received a Doctor in Philosophy in 1795. In 1795 he accompanied Sir Hugh Cleghorn, secretary to Lord North. Cleghorn made use of Rottler's knowledge of botany and natural history. A trunk full of plant specimens was sent to the Great Herbarium of King's College London. In 1873, this collection was transferred to the Royal Botanic Gardens, Kew, London. In 1803, Rottler was put in charge of the Vepery mission to replace Paezold who had moved to teach Tamil at the Fort William College.

His findings were published in Europe in 1803, but went largely overlooked for many years.

Most of Rottler's botanical collections are in the Royal Herbarium of Munich. Many of his plants were described by Carl Ludwig Willdenow, Martin Vahl and others. The genus Rottlera was named after him by Vahl but is now a synonym of Mallotus. A memorial tablet to Rottler is in the Vepery church.
