= Johann Gerhard König =

Baltic German botanist and physician

Johann Gerhard König (29 November 1728 – 26 June 1785) was a Baltic German botanist and physician who served in the Tranquebar Mission, India before joining service under the Nawab of Arcot, and then the English East India Company. He collected natural history specimens including plants, particularly those of medical interest, from the region and several species are named after him including the curry tree (Murraya koenigii).

== Biography ==
König was born near Kreutzburg in Polish Livonia, which is now Krustpils in Latvia. He was a private pupil of Carl Linnaeus in 1757, and lived in Denmark from 1759 to 1767 during which time he examined the plants of Iceland. In 1767 he joined as a medical officer to the Tranquebar Mission and on his voyage to India, he passed through Cape Town where he met Governor Rijk Tulbagh with an introduction from Linnaeus, collecting plants in the Table Mountain region from 1 to 28 April 1768. König replaced the position made available following the death of Halle-educated physician Samuel Benjamin Cnoll (1705–67). In 1774 he took up a better paying position as naturalist for the Nawab of Arcot, serving in that position until 1778. In 1773, he received the Doctor's degree in absentia from the University of Copenhagen possibly for his studies on indigenous remedies published as De remediorum indigenorum ad morbes cuivis regioni endemicos expuguandos efficacia. He became naturalist to the Nawab of Arcot in 1774 and embarked on a trip to the mountains north of Madras and to Ceylon, a description of which was later published in a Danish scientific journal. On 17 July 1778, König was appointed Naturalist at Madras with the British East India Company where he remained until his death, undertaking several scientific journeys and working with notable scientists like William Roxburgh, Johan Christian Fabricius and Sir Joseph Banks.

König followed the example of the Moravian South-Asian Mission in Tranquebar in collecting and trading natural history objects on a large scale. His engagement in natural history encouraged missionaries like Christoph Samuel John, Johan Peter Rottler and the mission doctor Johann Gottfried Klein of the Tranquebar Mission to follow this path. The mission doctor of the Moravian South-Asian Mission, Benjamin Heyne, also followed the example of König and was appointed Naturalist of the British East India Company in 1793. Most plants of König and his successors were sent back to Europe and described by A.J. Retzius, Roth, Schrader, Willdenow, Martin Vahl and James Edward Smith. Only Rottler published his own descriptions.

König made several visits around the region and perhaps the most notable of his journeys was to Siam and the Malacca Straits in 1778–80, in this period he spent several months studying the flora and fauna in Phuket. He met Patrick Russell who arrived in India in 1782 at Tranquebar and the two remained in constant communication. He made trips to the hills near Vellore and Ambur and in 1776 a trip to the Nagori hills with George Campbell. In 1784, he visited Russell at Vizagapatnam on his way to Calcutta. On the way he suffered from dysentery and Roxburgh who was at Samalkota oversaw his treatment. He however did not recover and died at Jagannadhapuram, Kakinada in 1785. He bequeathed his papers to Sir Joseph Banks.

He described many plants used in Indian Medicine and kept notes on other aspects of natural history including the termites of southern India and the collection and use of their alates as food. Koenig's collections of insects from southern India may have been used in descriptions by Fabricius.

The plant genus Koenigia was named for him by Linnaeus, as was a species of curry-leaf tree Murraya koenigii.

Preceded by Position established in 1778	Naturalist to the H.E.I.C. at Madras; 1778-1785	Succeeded by Patrick Russell
