= Marcus Elieser Bloch =

German doctor and naturalist

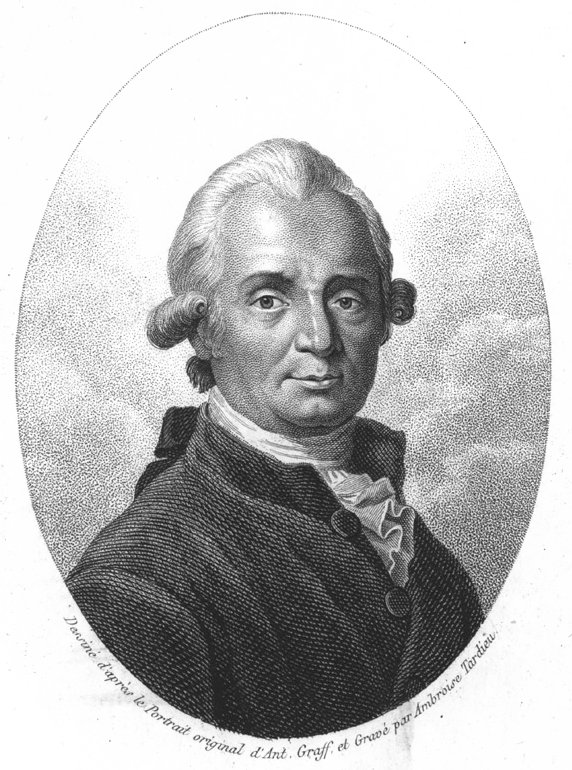
- Portrait by Anton Graff
- Born: 1723; Ansbach
- Died: 6 August 1799 (aged 75–76); Carlsbad
- Scientific career
- Fields: Ichthyology; Medicine; Natural history

Marcus Elieser Bloch (1723–1799) was a German physician and naturalist, who is best known for his contribution to ichthyology through his multivolume catalog of plates illustrating the fishes of the world. Brought up in a Hebrew-speaking Jewish family, he learned German and Latin and studied anatomy before settling in Berlin as a physician. He amassed a large natural history collection, particularly of fish specimens. He is generally considered one of the most important ichthyologists of the 18th century, and wrote many papers on natural history, comparative anatomy, and physiology.

== Life ==
Bloch was born at Ansbach in 1723, where his father was a Torah writer and his mother owned a small shop. Educated at home in Hebrew literature, he became a private tutor in Hamburg for a Jewish surgeon. Here, he learned German, Latin, and anatomy. He then studied medicine in Berlin and received a doctorate in 1762 from Frankfort on the Oder with a treatise on skin disorders. He then became a general practitioner in Berlin and married Breinche, daughter of "protected Jew" Ruben Joseph Rintel (1699–1765?) in 1765. This allowed him to settle in Berlin. Bloch helped found the Society of Friends of Natural Sciences in 1773 along with Moses Mendelssohn serving also as Mendelssohn's physician. He began to establish a large natural history collection and a library. He also began to publish in journals. Breinche died in 1769, and their only son died aged 21 while on a trip to Paris to sell the book on fishes that his father had written. In 1774, he married Cheile, daughter of banker Joseph Veitel Ephraim (1775–1807) and they had a daughter who married physician Wolf Davidson (1772–1800). After the death of Cheile, he married Rahel, daughter of a Jewish social worker, Jeremias Bendix (1735 -1790), and they had a son and two daughters.

Bloch became interested in fishes only in 1782 after finding fish for which he could not find a name in the works of Linnaeus. He then began to collect fishes and had fish specimens sent from around the world, including correspondents from as far as India, such as Johann Gerhard König and Christoph Samuel John. The collection was of nearly 1400 specimens and about 800 are now in the Bloch Cabinet of the Museum für Naturkunde, Berlin. He began to catalog the fishes of Germany in publications from 1782 to 1784, and on fishes from abroad until 1795, printing the books with copper-plate engravings made largely at his own expense. He later managed to get subscribers, including the Queen and Prince of Prussia, the Prince of Saxe-Coburg, the royal families of Denmark, Sweden, and Poland, and court banker Isaac Daniel Itzig. Bloch also published on medicine, writing on such topics as the waters of Pyrmont and intestinal parasitic worms.

Bloch visited Paris in 1797 to examine the fish collections there and returned via Holland. His health became poor and he went to Carlsbad, where he died of a stroke. He was buried in the Jewish cemetery at Lichtenstadt.

== Works and legacy ==
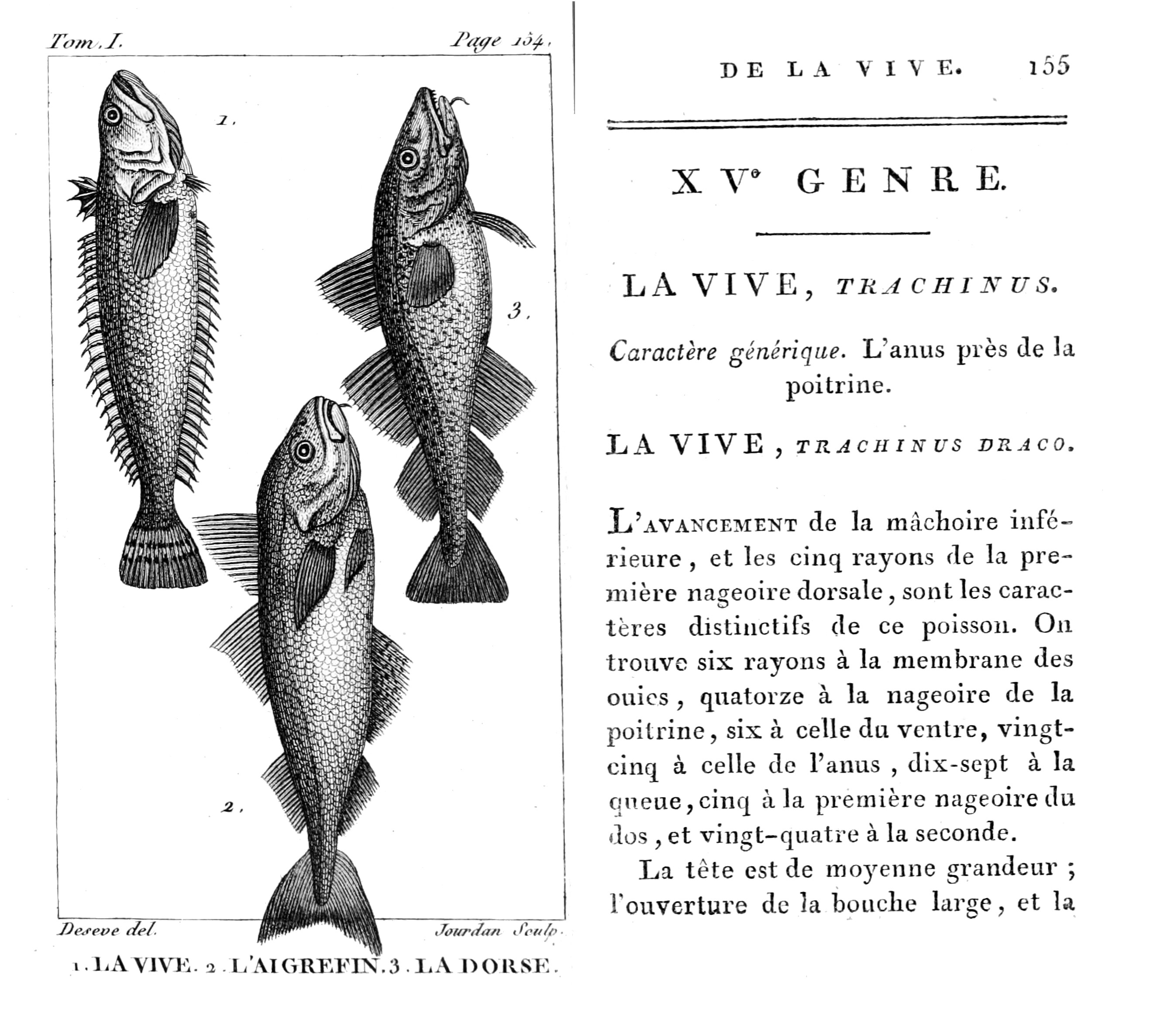
French edition of Bloch's work, Histoire naturelle des poissons (1801)

Bloch is best known for his encyclopedic work in ichthyology. Between 1782 and 1795, he published his Allgemeine Naturgeschichte der Fische, a 12-volume, illustrated, comprehensive work on fishes. The first three volumes describe fishes in Germany and were entitled Oeconomische Naturgeschichte der Fische Deutschlands, the remaining volumes (in 9 parts) dealt with fishes from other parts of the world and were entitled Naturgeschichte der ausländischen Fische. A French translation "Ichthyologie, ou histoire naturelle, générale et particulière des poissons" was published in 12 volumes between 1785 and 1797. His Systema Ichthologia was published posthumously by Johann G. Schneider. Bloch followed the fish systematics of Peter Artedi and Carl Linnaeus, although he added new systematic characters, including the presence or absence of a fifth gill, gill structure, and bony arches. He described at least 267 new species and 19 genera and several of his binomial names are still in use. Bloch's collection of about 800 surviving specimens is preserved at the Museum für Naturkunde of the Humboldt University of Berlin.
