= List of Tephrosia species =

As of November 2024, the following 364 species were accepted in the genus Tephrosia:

== A ==
- Tephrosia abbottiae C.E.Wood
- Tephrosia acaciifolia Welw. ex Baker
- Tephrosia adunca Benth.
- Tephrosia aequilata Baker
- Tephrosia alba Du Puy & Labat
- Tephrosia albissima H.M.L.Forbes
- Tephrosia alpestris Taub.
- Tephrosia amoena E.Mey.
- Tephrosia amorphifolia Kunth & C.D.Bouché
- Tephrosia andongensis Welw. ex Baker
- Tephrosia andrewii Cowie
- Tephrosia angustissima Shuttlew. ex Chapm.
- Tephrosia anomala Thulin
- Tephrosia arenicola Maconochie
- Tephrosia argyrolampra Harms
- Tephrosia argyrotricha Harms
- Tephrosia arnhemica C.T.White
- Tephrosia astragaloides Benth.
- Tephrosia athiensis Baker f.
- Tephrosia aurantiaca Harms

== B ==
- Tephrosia bachmannii Harms
- Tephrosia barbatala Bosman & A.J.P.de Haas
- Tephrosia barberi J.R.Drumm.
- Tephrosia baueri Benth. ex A.Gray
- Tephrosia belizensis Lundell
- Tephrosia benthamii Pedley
- Tephrosia berhautiana Lescot
- Tephrosia betsileensis (R.Vig.) Du Puy & Labat
- Tephrosia bibracteolata (Dumaz-le-Grand) Du Puy & Labat
- Tephrosia bidwillii Benth.
- Tephrosia bifacialis Cowie
- Tephrosia boiviniana Baill.
- Tephrosia brachycarpa F.Muell. ex Benth.
- Tephrosia brachyodon Domin
- Tephrosia bracteolata Guill. & Perr.
- Tephrosia brandegeei (Standl.) L.Riley
- Tephrosia brummittii Schrire
- Tephrosia burchellii Burtt Davy

== C ==
- Tephrosia caerulea Baker f.
- Tephrosia calophylla Bedd.
- Tephrosia cana Brandegee
- Tephrosia canarensis J.R.Drumm.
- Tephrosia candida DC.
- Tephrosia capensis (Jacq.) Pers.
- Tephrosia capitata Verdc.
- Tephrosia cardiophylla R.Butcher
- Tephrosia carriemichelliae Cowie
- Tephrosia carrollii O.Téllez
- Tephrosia cephalantha Welw. ex Baker
- Tephrosia cephalophora Harms
- Tephrosia chaquenha R.T.Queiroz & A.M.G.Azevedo
- Tephrosia chimanimaniana Brummitt
- Tephrosia chisumpae Brummitt
- Tephrosia chrysophylla Pursh
- Tephrosia cinerea (L.) Pers.
- Tephrosia clementii Skan
- Tephrosia clementis Alain
- Tephrosia coccinea Wall.
- Tephrosia collina V.S.Sharma
- Tephrosia conspicua W.Fitzg.
- Tephrosia conzattii (Rydb.) Standl.
- Tephrosia cordata Hutch. & Burtt Davy
- Tephrosia cordatistipula J.B.Gillett
- Tephrosia coriacea Benth.
- Tephrosia coronilloides Welw. ex Baker
- Tephrosia cowiei R.Butcher
- Tephrosia crassifolia Benth.
- Tephrosia crocea Benth.
- Tephrosia cuernavacana (Rose) J.F.Macbr.
- Tephrosia curvata De Wild.

== D ==
- Tephrosia dasyphylla Welw. ex Baker
- Tephrosia debilis Domin
- Tephrosia decaryana (Dumaz-le-Grand) Du Puy & Labat
- Tephrosia decora Welw. ex Baker
- Tephrosia decumbens Benth. ex Oerst.
- Tephrosia deflexa Baker
- Tephrosia delestangii Pedley
- Tephrosia delicatula Pedley
- Tephrosia densa (Benth.) Pedley ex R.Butcher
- Tephrosia densiflora Hook.f.
- Tephrosia dichroocarpa Steud. ex A.Rich.
- Tephrosia dietrichiae Domin
- Tephrosia disperma Welw. ex Baker
- Tephrosia diversifolia (Rose) J.F.Macbr.
- Tephrosia djalonica A.Chev. ex Hutch. & Dalziel
- Tephrosia domingensis (Willd.) Pers.
- Tephrosia dregeana E.Mey.
- Tephrosia drepanocarpa Welw. ex Baker
- Tephrosia dura Baker

== E ==
- Tephrosia egregia Sandwith
- Tephrosia elata Deflers
- Tephrosia elegans Schumach.
- Tephrosia elliptica Bosman & A.J.P.de Haas
- Tephrosia elongata E.Mey.
- Tephrosia emeroides A.Rich.
- Tephrosia ephippioides Cowie
- Tephrosia eriocarpa Benth.
- Tephrosia euchroa I.Verd.
- Tephrosia euprepes Brummitt

== F ==
- Tephrosia falciformis Ramaswami
- Tephrosia faulknerae Brummitt
- Tephrosia fertilis R.T.Queiroz & A.M.G.Azevedo
- Tephrosia festina Brummitt
- Tephrosia filiflora Chiov.
- Tephrosia filipes Benth.
- Tephrosia flagellaris Domin
- Tephrosia flammea F.Muell. ex Benth.
- Tephrosia flava Thulin
- Tephrosia flexuosa G.Don
- Tephrosia florida (F.Dietr.) C.E.Wood
- Tephrosia foliolosa (Rydb.) L.Riley
- Tephrosia forbesii Baker
- Tephrosia forrestiana F.Muell.
- Tephrosia fulvinervis Hochst. ex A.Rich.
- Tephrosia funicularis R.Butcher
- Tephrosia fusca Wight & Arn.

== G ==
- Tephrosia galpinii H.M.L.Forbes
- Tephrosia gardneri Pedley ex R.Butcher
- Tephrosia gaudium-solis Domin
- Tephrosia geminiflora Baker
- Tephrosia genistoides (Dumaz-le-Grand) Du Puy & Labat
- Tephrosia glomeruliflora Meisn.
- Tephrosia gobensis Brummitt
- Tephrosia gorgonea Cout.
- Tephrosia gossweileri Baker f.
- Tephrosia gracilenta H.M.L.Forbes
- Tephrosia gracilipes Guill. & Perr.
- Tephrosia graminifolia F.Muell. ex Benth.
- Tephrosia grandibracteata Merxm.
- Tephrosia grandiflora (L'Hér.) Pers.
- Tephrosia griseola H.M.L.Forbes
- Tephrosia guaranitica Chodat & Hassl.
- Tephrosia guayameoensis O.Téllez
- Tephrosia gyropoda Cowie

== H ==
- Tephrosia hadramautica Thulin
- Tephrosia hassleri Chodat
- Tephrosia haussknechtii Bornm.
- Tephrosia heterophylla Vatke
- Tephrosia hildebrandtii Vatke
- Tephrosia hispidula (Michx.) Pers.
- Tephrosia hochstetteri Chiov.
- Tephrosia hockii De Wild.
- Tephrosia holstii Taub.
- Tephrosia hookeriana Wight & Arn.
- Tephrosia huillensis Welw. ex Baker
- Tephrosia humbertii Dumaz-le-Grand
- Tephrosia humifusa Cowie
- Tephrosia humilis Guill. & Perr.
- Tephrosia hypoleuca L.Riley

== I ==
- Tephrosia ibityensis (R.Vig.) Du Puy & Labat
- Tephrosia inandensis H.M.L.Forbes
- Tephrosia insolens R.Butcher & Cowie
- Tephrosia × intermedia (Small) G.L.Nesom & Zarucchi
- Tephrosia interrupta Hochst. & Steud. ex Engl.
- Tephrosia ionophlebia Hayata
- Tephrosia iringae Baker f.
- Tephrosia isaloensis Du Puy & Labat

== J ==
- Tephrosia jamnagarensis Santapau
- Tephrosia juncea Benth.

== K ==
- Tephrosia kalamboensis Brummitt & J.B.Gillett
- Tephrosia karkarensis Thulin
- Tephrosia kasikiensis Baker f.
- Tephrosia kassasii Boulos
- Tephrosia katangensis De Wild.
- Tephrosia kazibensis Cronquist
- Tephrosia kerrii J.R.Drumm. & Craib
- Tephrosia kindiana Haba, B.J.Holt & Burgt
- Tephrosia kindu De Wild.
- Tephrosia kraussiana Meisn.

== L ==
- Tephrosia lamprolobioides F.Muell.
- Tephrosia lanata M.Martens & Galeotti
- Tephrosia langlassei Micheli
- Tephrosia lasiochlaena Cowie
- Tephrosia lathyroides Guill. & Perr.
- Tephrosia laxa Domin
- Tephrosia laxiflora R.E.Fr.
- Tephrosia lebrunii Staner ex Cronquist
- Tephrosia leiocarpa A.Gray
- Tephrosia lepida Baker f.
- Tephrosia leptoclada Benth.
- Tephrosia letestui Tisser.
- Tephrosia leucantha Kunth
- Tephrosia leveillei Domin
- Tephrosia limpopoensis J.B.Gillett
- Tephrosia lindheimeri A.Gray
- Tephrosia linearis (Willd.) Pers.
- Tephrosia lithosperma R.Butcher & Cowie
- Tephrosia longipes Meisn.
- Tephrosia lortii Baker f.
- Tephrosia lupinifolia DC.
- Tephrosia lurida Sond.
- Tephrosia luzoniensis Vogel
- Tephrosia lyallii Baker

== M ==
- Tephrosia macbrideana R.T.Queiroz, G.P.Lewis & A.M.G.Azevedo
- Tephrosia macrantha B.L.Rob. & Greenm. ex Pringle
- Tephrosia macrocarpa Benth.
- Tephrosia macropoda (E.Mey.) Harv.
- Tephrosia macrostachya (Benth.) Domin
- Tephrosia maculata Merr. & L.M.Perry
- Tephrosia madrensis Seem.
- Tephrosia mahrana Thulin
- Tephrosia major Micheli
- Tephrosia malvina Brummitt
- Tephrosia manikensis De Wild.
- Tephrosia marginata Hassl.
- Tephrosia marginella H.M.L.Forbes
- Tephrosia mariana DC.
- Tephrosia maxima (L.) Pers.
- Tephrosia melanocalyx Welw. ex Baker
- Tephrosia mexicana C.E.Wood
- Tephrosia micrantha J.B.Gillett
- Tephrosia microcarpa O.Téllez
- Tephrosia miranda Brummitt
- Tephrosia mohrii (Rydb.) R.K.Godfrey
- Tephrosia monophylla Schinz
- Tephrosia montana Brummitt
- Tephrosia moroubensis Tisser.
- Tephrosia mossiensis A.Chev.
- Tephrosia muenzneri Harms
- Tephrosia multifolia Rose
- Tephrosia multijuga R.G.N.Young
- Tephrosia mysteriosa DeLaney

== N ==
- Tephrosia nana Kotschy ex Schweinf.
- Tephrosia natalensis H.M.L.Forbes
- Tephrosia nematophylla F.Muell.
- Tephrosia newtoniana Torre
- Tephrosia nicaraguensis Oerst.
- Tephrosia nitens Benth.
- Tephrosia noctiflora Bojer ex Baker
- Tephrosia nseleensis De Wild.
- Tephrosia nubica (Boiss.) Baker
- Tephrosia nyikensis Baker

== O ==
- Tephrosia obbiadensis Chiov.
- Tephrosia obcordata (Poir.) Baker
- Tephrosia oblongata Benth.
- Tephrosia obovata Merr.
- Tephrosia odorata Balf.f.
- Tephrosia oligophylla Benth.
- Tephrosia onobrychoides Nutt.
- Tephrosia oubanguiensis Tisser.
- Tephrosia oxalidea R.Butcher & P.J.H.Hurter
- Tephrosia oxygona Welw. ex Baker

== P ==
- Tephrosia pachypoda L.Riley
- Tephrosia pallida H.M.L.Forbes
- Tephrosia palmeri S.Watson
- Tephrosia paniculata Welw. ex Baker
- Tephrosia paradoxa Brummitt
- Tephrosia parvifolia (R.Vig.) Du Puy & Labat
- Tephrosia paucijuga Harms
- Tephrosia pearsonii Baker f.
- Tephrosia pedicellata Baker
- Tephrosia pedleyi R.Butcher
- Tephrosia pentaphylla (Roxb.) G.Don
- Tephrosia perrieri R.Vig.
- Tephrosia persica Boiss.
- Tephrosia phaeosperma F.Muell. ex Benth.
- Tephrosia phylloxylon (R.Vig.) Du Puy & Labat
- Tephrosia pietersii H.M.L.Forbes
- Tephrosia pinifolia Du Puy & Labat
- Tephrosia platycarpa Guill. & Perr.
- Tephrosia platyphylla (Rose) Standl.
- Tephrosia pogonocalyx C.E.Wood
- Tephrosia polyphylla (Chiov.) J.B.Gillett
- Tephrosia polystachya E.Mey.
- Tephrosia polyzyga F.Muell. ex Benth.
- Tephrosia pondoensis (Codd) Schrire
- Tephrosia porrecta Benth.
- Tephrosia potosina Brandegee
- Tephrosia praecana Brummitt
- Tephrosia pringlei (Rose) J.F.Macbr.
- Tephrosia procera Cowie
- Tephrosia pumila (Lam.) Pers.
- Tephrosia punctata J.B.Gillett
- Tephrosia pungens (R.Vig.) Du Puy & Labat
- Tephrosia purpurea (L.) Pers.

== Q ==
- Tephrosia quercetorum C.E.Wood

== R ==
- Tephrosia radicans Welw. ex Baker
- Tephrosia rechingeri Ali
- Tephrosia remotiflora F.Muell. ex Benth.
- Tephrosia reptans Baker
- Tephrosia retamoides (Baker) Soler.
- Tephrosia reticulata Benth.
- Tephrosia retusa Burtt Davy
- Tephrosia rhodantha Brandegee
- Tephrosia rhodesica Baker f.
- Tephrosia richardsiae J.B.Gillett
- Tephrosia rigida Span.
- Tephrosia rigidula Welw. ex Baker
- Tephrosia ringoetii Baker f.
- Tephrosia robinsoniana Brummitt
- Tephrosia rosea F.Muell. ex Benth.
- Tephrosia roxburghiana J.R.Drumm.
- Tephrosia rufula Pedley
- Tephrosia rugelii Shuttlew. ex B.L.Rob.
- Tephrosia rupicola J.B.Gillett

== S ==
- Tephrosia sabulosa R.Butcher
- Tephrosia sara-almeidae M.R.Almeida
- Tephrosia savannicola Domin
- Tephrosia saxicola C.E.Wood
- Tephrosia scopulata Thulin
- Tephrosia seemannii (Britten & Baker f.) K.Schum.
- Tephrosia semiglabra Sond.
- Tephrosia sengaensis Baker f.
- Tephrosia senna Kunth
- Tephrosia senticosa Pers.
- Tephrosia sessiliflora (Poir.) Hassl.
- Tephrosia shamimii Ali
- Tephrosia shiluwanensis Schinz
- Tephrosia simplicifolia F.Muell. ex Benth.
- Tephrosia simulans C.E.Wood
- Tephrosia sinapou (Buc'hoz) A.Chev.
- Tephrosia singuliflora F.Muell.
- Tephrosia socotrana Thulin
- Tephrosia sousae O.Téllez
- Tephrosia spechtii Pedley
- Tephrosia sphaerospora F.Muell.
- Tephrosia spicata (Walter) Torr. & A.Gray
- Tephrosia spinosa (L.f.) Pers.
- Tephrosia stipuligera W.Fitzg.
- Tephrosia stormsii De Wild.
- Tephrosia strigosa (Dalzell) Santapau & Maheshw.
- Tephrosia stuartii Benth.
- Tephrosia subaphylla R.Vig. ex Du Puy & Labat
- Tephrosia submontana (Rose) L.Riley
- Tephrosia subnuda Domin
- Tephrosia subpectinata Domin
- Tephrosia subpraecox Cronquist
- Tephrosia subtriflora Hochst. ex Baker
- Tephrosia subulata Hutch. & Burtt Davy
- Tephrosia supina Domin
- Tephrosia sylitroides Baker f.
- Tephrosia sylviae Berhaut

== T ==
- Tephrosia tanganicensis De Wild.
- Tephrosia tepicana (Standl.) Standl.
- Tephrosia thurberi (Rydb.) C.E.Wood
- Tephrosia timoriensis DC.
- Tephrosia tinctoria (L.) Pers.
- Tephrosia tomentosa (Forssk.) Pers.
- Tephrosia travancorica Thoth. & D.N.Das
- Tephrosia tuitoensis O.Téllez
- Tephrosia tundavalensis Bamps
- Tephrosia turpinii Pedley

== U ==
- Tephrosia uniflora Pers.
- Tephrosia uniovulata F.Muell.
- Tephrosia uzondoensis F.M.Crawford

== V ==
- Tephrosia valleculata Cowie
- Tephrosia varians (F.M.Bailey) C.T.White
- Tephrosia × varioforma DeLaney
- Tephrosia verdickii De Wild.
- Tephrosia vernicosa C.E.Wood
- Tephrosia vestita Vogel
- Tephrosia vicioides Schltdl.
- Tephrosia viguieri Du Puy & Labat
- Tephrosia villosa (L.) Pers.
- Tephrosia virens Pedley
- Tephrosia virgata H.M.L.Forbes
- Tephrosia virginiana (L.) Pers.
- Tephrosia viridiflora O.Téllez
- Tephrosia vogelii Hook.f.
- Tephrosia vohimenaensis Du Puy & Labat

== W ==
- Tephrosia watsoniana (Standl.) J.F.Macbr.
- Tephrosia whyteana Baker f.
- Tephrosia wynaadensis J.R.Drumm.

== Z ==
- Tephrosia zambiana Brummitt
- Tephrosia zollingeri Backer
- Tephrosia zoutpansbergensis Bremek.
