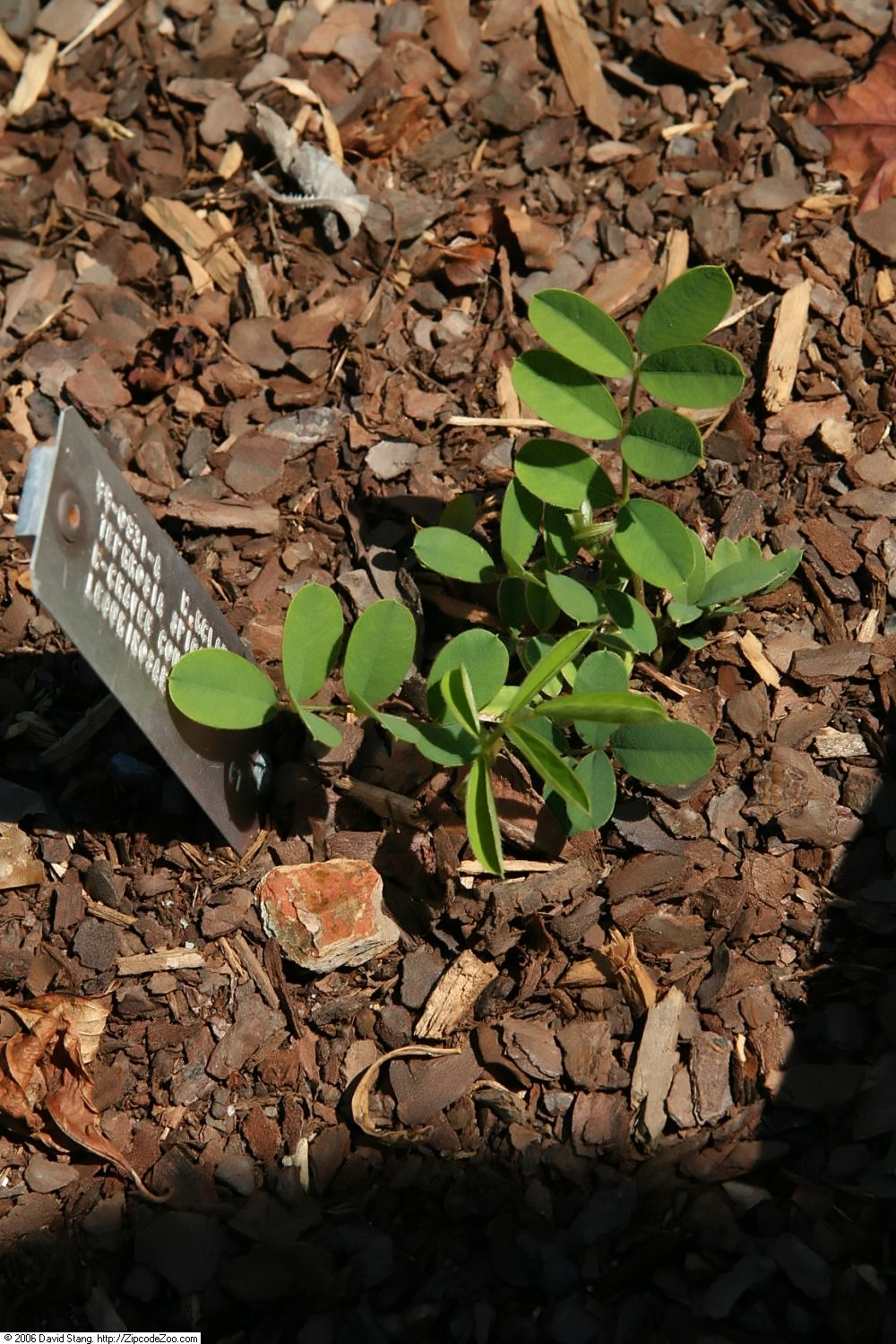
- Tephrosia spicata at the United States Botanic Garden, Washington D.C.

Scientific classification
- Kingdom: Plantae
- Clade: Tracheophytes
- Clade: Angiosperms
- Clade: Eudicots
- Clade: Rosids
- Order: Fabales
- Family: Fabaceae
- Subfamily: Faboideae
- Genus: Tephrosia
- Species: T. spicata

Binomial name
- Tephrosia spicata (Walter) Torr. & A. Gray

= Tephrosia spicata =

Species of herbaceous perennial

Tephrosia spicata, known commonly as spiked hoarypea, is a plant that grows in North America.

== Description ==
Tephrosia spicata is an herbaceous perennial that grows from a cylindric taproot. It has odd-pinnate leaves with 7 to 29 leaflets (or rarely 1 to 41). Leaves are 4 to 12 cm (1.6 to 4.7 in) long with oblong-obovate to obovate or elliptic leaflets. Leaflets are entire, glabrous or pubescent above and always pubescent beneath, often with prominent secondary veins parallel to each other.

Inflorescences present opposite leaves or terminally, blooming May through August. They are generally 4 to 60 cm (1.6 to 23.6 in) long, curling upward, beginning yellowish white and developing into a pinkish red. Legumes grow 3 to 5 cm (1.2 to 2.0 in) long and 4 to 6 mm (0.16 to 0.24 in) broad with sparse to moderate pubescence and trichomes greater than 0.6 mm (0.024 in) long. T. spicata can be differentiated from T. hispidula by its greater number of flowers and more conspicuous gray hairs.

== Distribution and habitat ==
Tephrosia spicata is native to the southeastern and mid-Atlantic United States, from southern Delaware to Florida and west to Louisiana and Kentucky. It grows in habitats with dry soils, commonly pine/scrub oak sandhills, longleaf pine sandhills, and other dry oak or mixed hardwood communities.

It decreased in occurrence after agriculture-related soil disturbance in southwest Georgia. However, it increased in frequency and biomass in response to soil disturbance by clearcutting and chopping in north Florida flatwoods forests.

Tephrosia spicata is an indicator species for the Upper Florida Panhandle Savannas community type as described in Carr et al. (2010). It has been known to persist through repeated annual burns.
