= T. rosea =

T. rosea may refer to:

- Tabebuia rosea, the roble de Sabana, a neotropical tree species
- Tephrosia rosea, a legume species

== See also ==
- Rosea (disambiguation)
