= Patuletin =

- Chemical structure of patuletin

Names
- IUPAC name 3,3′,4′,5,7-Pentahydroxy-6-methoxyflavone
- Systematic IUPAC name 2-(3,4-Dihydroxyphenyl)-3,5,7-trihydroxy-6-methoxy-4H-1-benzopyran-4-one
- Other names 6-Methoxyquercetin; Quercetagetin 6-methyl ether 2-(3,4-Dihydroxyphenyl)-3,5,7-trihydroxy-6-methoxy-4-benzopyrone

Identifiers
CAS Number	519-96-0
3D model (JSmol)	Interactive image
ChEBI	CHEBI:75164
ChEMBL	ChEMBL465155
ChemSpider	4444997
ECHA InfoCard	100.007.529
EC Number	208-280-8
PubChem CID	5281678
UNII	9BNM33N01N
CompTox Dashboard (EPA)	DTXSID20199864
- InChI: InChI=1S/C16H12O8/c1-23-16-9(19)5-10-11(13(16)21)12(20)14(22)15(24-10)6-2-3-7(17)8(18)4-6/h2-5,17-19,21-22H,1H3 Key: JMIFIYIEXODVTO-UHFFFAOYSA-N; InChI=1/C16H12O8/c1-23-16-9(19)5-10-11(13(16)21)12(20)14(22)15(24-10)6-2-3-7(17)8(18)4-6/h2-5,17-19,21-22H,1H3 Key: JMIFIYIEXODVTO-UHFFFAOYAR
- SMILES: COC1=C(C=C2C(=C1O)C(=O)C(=C(O2)C3=CC(=C(C=C3)O)O)O)O

Properties
Chemical formula	C_{16}H_{12}O_{8}
Molar mass	332.264 g·mol^{−1}
- Except where otherwise noted, data are given for materials in their standard state (at 25 °C [77 °F], 100 kPa). verify (what is ?) Infobox references

Patuletin is an O-methylated flavonol. It can be found in the genus Eriocaulon.

== Glycosides ==
Patuletin glycosides can be found in Ipomopsis aggregata.

Patuletin-3-O-rutinoside can be isolated from the aerial parts of Echinacea angustifolia.

Patuletin acetylrhamnosides can be isolated from Kalanchoe brasiliensis.
