= T. spinosa =

T. spinosa may refer to:

- Tara spinosa, a synonym for Caesalpinia spinosa, a tree species found in South America
- Tephrosia spinosa, a flowering plant species native from India, Sri Lanka, Malaysia and Indonesia

== See also ==
- Spinosa (disambiguation)
