= Eupatolitin =

- Chemical structure of eupatolitin

Names
- IUPAC name 3,3′,4′,5-Tetrahydroxy-6,7-dimethoxyflavone
- Systematic IUPAC name 2-(3,4-Dihydroxyphenyl)-3,5-dihydroxy-6,7-dimethoxy-4H-1-benzopyran-4-one

Identifiers
| CAS Number | 29536-44-5 |
| 3D model (JSmol) | Interactive image |
| ChEBI | CHEBI:81340 |
| ChemSpider | 4476179 |
| PubChem CID | 5317291 |
| UNII | 9KB4QHZ4YG |
| CompTox Dashboard (EPA) | DTXSID80183724 |
- InChI: InChI=1S/C17H14O8/c1-23-11-6-10-12(14(21)17(11)24-2)13(20)15(22)16(25-10)7-3-4-8(18)9(19)5-7/h3-6,18-19,21-22H,1-2H3 Key: WYKWHSPRHPZRCR-UHFFFAOYSA-N; InChI=1/C17H14O8/c1-23-11-6-10-12(14(21)17(11)24-2)13(20)15(22)16(25-10)7-3-4-8(18)9(19)5-7/h3-6,18-19,21-22H,1-2H3 Key: WYKWHSPRHPZRCR-UHFFFAOYAP
- SMILES: O=C1c3c(O)c(OC)c(OC)cc3O/C(=C1/O)c2ccc(O)c(O)c2

Properties
| Chemical formula | C_{17}H_{14}O_{8} |
| Molar mass | 346.291 g·mol^{−1} |
| Density | 1.592 g/mL |
- Except where otherwise noted, data are given for materials in their standard state (at 25 °C [77 °F], 100 kPa). verify (what is ?) Infobox references

Eupatolitin is a chemical compound. It is an O-methylated flavonol, a type of flavonoid. Eupatolitin can be found in Brickellia veronicaefolia and in Ipomopsis aggregata.

== Glycoside ==
Eupatolin is a eupatolitin glycoside containing a rhamnose attached at the 3 position. It can be found in Eupatorium ligustrinum.
