= Brickellin =

- Chemical structure of brickellin

Names
- IUPAC name 2′,5-Dihydroxy-3,4′,5′,6,7-pentamethoxyflavone
- Systematic IUPAC name 5-Hydroxy-2-(2-hydroxy-4,5-dimethoxyphenyl)-3,6,7-trimethoxy-4H-1-benzopyran-4-one

Identifiers
CAS Number	90357-63-4
3D model (JSmol)	Interactive image
ChEMBL	ChEMBL484666
ChemSpider	10289865
PubChem CID	13871363
UNII	MQ8CVA2BQ4
CompTox Dashboard (EPA)	DTXSID50551638
- InChI: InChI=1S/C20H20O9/c1-24-11-6-9(10(21)7-12(11)25-2)18-20(28-5)17(23)15-13(29-18)8-14(26-3)19(27-4)16(15)22/h6-8,21-22H,1-5H3 Key: USWPTYUGAMOLAB-UHFFFAOYSA-N; InChI=1/C20H20O9/c1-24-11-6-9(10(21)7-12(11)25-2)18-20(28-5)17(23)15-13(29-18)8-14(26-3)19(27-4)16(15)22/h6-8,21-22H,1-5H3 Key: USWPTYUGAMOLAB-UHFFFAOYAR
- SMILES: COc3cc(C=1Oc2cc(OC)c(OC)c(O)c2C(=O)C=1OC)c(O)cc3OC

Properties
Chemical formula	C_{20}H_{20}O_{9}
Molar mass	404.371 g·mol^{−1}
Density	1.443 g/mL
- Except where otherwise noted, data are given for materials in their standard state (at 25 °C [77 °F], 100 kPa). verify (what is ?) Infobox references

Brickellin is an O-methylated flavonol. It can be found in Brickellia veronicifolia.
