= Eupalin =

Names
- IUPAC name 5-Hydroxy-2-(4-hydroxyphenyl)-6,7-dimethoxy-3-(3,4,5-trihydroxy-6-methyloxan-2-yl)oxychromen-4-one

Identifiers
CAS Number	29617-75-2
3D model (JSmol)	Interactive image
ChEMBL	ChEMBL483203
ChemSpider	4508995; 4572250
PubChem CID	5458259
UNII	T9YV6RMN56
CompTox Dashboard (EPA)	DTXSID70952087
- InChI: InChI=1S/C23H24O11/c1-9-15(25)18(28)19(29)23(32-9)34-22-17(27)14-12(8-13(30-2)21(31-3)16(14)26)33-20(22)10-4-6-11(24)7-5-10/h4-9,15,18-19,23-26,28-29H,1-3H3/t9-,15-,18+,19+,23-/m0/s1 Key: CXVSHWFUBVZVSW-YPNBZCAISA-N; InChI=1/C23H24O11/c1-9-15(25)18(28)19(29)23(32-9)34-22-17(27)14-12(8-13(30-2)21(31-3)16(14)26)33-20(22)10-4-6-11(24)7-5-10/h4-9,15,18-19,23-26,28-29H,1-3H3/t9-,15-,18+,19+,23-/m0/s1 Key: CXVSHWFUBVZVSW-YPNBZCAIBS
- SMILES: C[C@H]1[C@@H]([C@H]([C@H]([C@@H](O1)OC2=C(OC3=CC(=C(C(=C3C2=O)O)OC)OC)C4=CC=C(C=C4)O)O)O)O

Properties
Chemical formula	C_{23}H_{24}O_{11}
Molar mass	476.434 g·mol^{−1}
- Except where otherwise noted, data are given for materials in their standard state (at 25 °C [77 °F], 100 kPa). Infobox references

Eupalin is a flavonol. It is the eupalitin 3-O-rhamnoside. It can be isolated from Eupatorium ligustrinum.
