= Eupalitin =

- Chemical structure of eupalitin

Names
- IUPAC name 3,4′,5-Trihydroxy-6,7-dimethoxyflavone
- Systematic IUPAC name 3,5-Dihydroxy-2-(4-hydroxyphenyl)-6,7-dimethoxy-4H-1-benzopyran-4-one
- Other names Betuletol

Identifiers
CAS Number	29536-41-2
3D model (JSmol)	Interactive image
ChEMBL	ChEMBL487184
ChemSpider	4678044
PubChem CID	5748611
UNII	P5KF23690D
CompTox Dashboard (EPA)	DTXSID20183723
- InChI: InChI=1S/C17H14O7/c1-22-11-7-10-12(14(20)17(11)23-2)13(19)15(21)16(24-10)8-3-5-9(18)6-4-8/h3-7,18,20-21H,1-2H3 Key: KWMAWXWUGIEVDG-UHFFFAOYSA-N; InChI=1/C17H14O7/c1-22-11-7-10-12(14(20)17(11)23-2)13(19)15(21)16(24-10)8-3-5-9(18)6-4-8/h3-7,18,20-21H,1-2H3 Key: KWMAWXWUGIEVDG-UHFFFAOYAI
- SMILES: O=C1c3c(O)c(OC)c(OC)cc3O/C(=C1/O)c2ccc(O)cc2

Properties
Chemical formula	C_{17}H_{14}O_{7}
Molar mass	330.292 g·mol^{−1}
- Except where otherwise noted, data are given for materials in their standard state (at 25 °C [77 °F], 100 kPa). verify (what is ?) Infobox references

Eupalitin is an O-methylated flavonol. It can be found in Ipomopsis aggregata.

== Glycosides ==
Eupalitin 3-O-β-D-galactopyranoside can be isolated from Tephrosia spinosa.

Eupalin is the eupalitin 30-rhamnoside.
