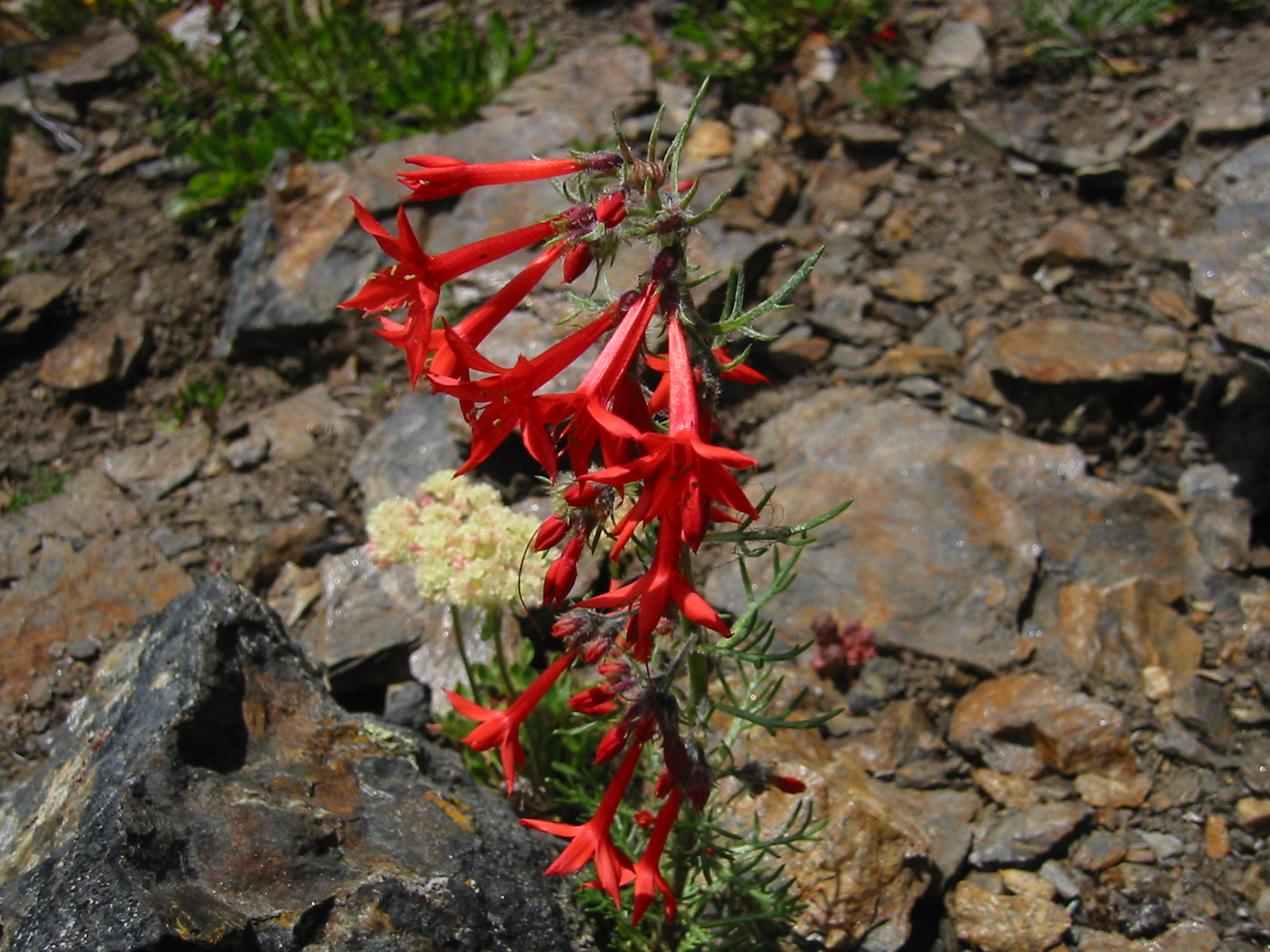
- In the Wenatchee Mountains

Conservation status
- Secure (NatureServe)

Scientific classification
- Kingdom: Plantae
- Clade: Tracheophytes
- Clade: Angiosperms
- Clade: Eudicots
- Clade: Asterids
- Order: Ericales
- Family: Polemoniaceae
- Genus: Ipomopsis
- Species: I. aggregata

Binomial name
- Ipomopsis aggregata (Pursh) V.E.Grant

Subspecies
- I. a. subsp. aggregata; I. a. subsp. attenuata; I. a. subsp. bridgesii; I. a. subsp. candida; I. a. subsp. carmenensis; I. a. subsp. collina; I. a. subsp. formosissima; I. a. subsp. weberi

Synonyms
- List: Batanthes aggregata (Pursh) Raf.; Batanthes attenuata (A.Gray) Greene; Batanthes bridgesii (A.Gray) Greene; Batanthes collina (Greene) Greene; Batanthes flavida (Greene) Greene; Batanthes formosissima (Greene) Greene; Batanthes leucantha (Greene) Greene; Batanthes pulchella (Douglas ex Benth.) Greene; Batanthes scopulorum Greene; Batanthes texana (Greene) Greene; Callisteris aggregata (Pursh) Greene; Callisteris attenuata Greene; Callisteris bridgesii Greene; Callisteris collina Greene; Callisteris flavida Greene; Callisteris formosissima Greene; Callisteris leucantha Greene; Callisteris pulchella (Douglas ex Benth.) Greene; Callisteris texana Greene; Cantua aggregata Pursh; Collomia aggregata (Pursh) Porter ex A.Gray; Gilia aggregata (Pursh) Spreng.; Gilia aggregata var. attenuata A.Gray; Gilia aggregata f. aurea J.F.Macbr. & Payson; Gilia aggregata subsp. bridgesii (A.Gray) Brand; Gilia aggregata var. bridgesii A.Gray; Gilia aggregata var. candida (Rydb.) Cronquist; Gilia aggregata f. candida Brand; Gilia aggregata subsp. euaggregata Brand; Gilia aggregata subsp. formosissima (Greene) Wherry; Gilia aggregata subvar. helleri Brand; Gilia aggregata var. maculata M.E.Jones; Gilia aggregata f. maculata (M.E.Jones) Wherry; Gilia aggregata f. pulchella (Douglas ex Benth.) Wherry; Gilia aggregata var. texana (Greene) I.M.Johnst.; Gilia aggregata var. typica Brand; Gilia aggregata f. ventrensis Brand; Gilia attenuata (A.Gray) A.Nelson; Gilia attenuata var. collina Cockerell; Gilia attenuata f. helleri (Brand) Wherry; Gilia attenuata f. ventrensis (Brand) Wherry; Gilia bridgesii (Greene) Wherry; Gilia candida Rydb.; Gilia candida subsp. collina (Greene) Wherry; Gilia candida f. leucantha (Greene) Wherry; Gilia candida f. scariosa (Rydb.) Wherry; Gilia candida subsp. vera Wherry; Gilia formosissima (Greene) Wooton & Standl.; Gilia greeneana Wooton & Standl.; Gilia pulchella Douglas ex Benth.; Gilia scariosa Rydb.; Gilia texana (Greene) Wooton & Standl.; Gilia texana f. flavida (Greene) Wherry; Ipomeria aggregata (Pursh) Nutt.; Ipomopsis aggregata var. attenuata (A.Gray) Dorn; Ipomopsis aggregata var. maculata (M.E.Jones) S.L.Welsh; Ipomopsis aggregata subsp. texana (Greene) Wherry; Ipomopsis aggregata var. texana (Greene) Shinners; Ipomopsis bridgesii (A.Gray) Wherry; Ipomopsis candida (Rydb.) Wherry; Ipomopsis elegans Lindl.; Navarretia aggregata (Pursh) Kuntze

= Ipomopsis aggregata =

Plant species in the phlox family

Ipomopsis aggregata is a species of biennial flowering plant in the phlox family, Polemoniaceae, commonly known as scarlet skyrocket, scarlet gilia, or skyrocket.

== Description ==
Scarlet skyrockets are herbaceous plants that grow a flowering stem that is typically 20 to 100 centimeters (8–39 in) tall. They have characteristic red, trumpet-shaped flowers and basal leaves stemming from a single erect stem. Trumpet flowers can range from white, red, orange-red, and pink. Pink flowers are especially common in high mesa areas of Colorado, such as the Flat Tops, Grand Mesa, or the Uncompahgre Plateau. Yellow flowers have been reported for plant but are extremely rare. Fernlike leaves are low to the ground, helping encourage warmth in colder areas, and have silver specks and a fine white pubescence. A well-known delicacy in nature, I. aggregata is well adapted to herbivory, as it can regrow multiple flowering stalks once lost. Although herbivory initially reduces seed and fruit count of the plant, intermediate herbivory and its stimulating factors could lead to the plant growing larger over time.

The many flowers, usually around 84 per plant, open in a series over four to seven weeks.

Scarlet skyrockets are generally a monocarpic plant, with plants dying after setting seed, but can very rarely go on to flower a second time. Field studies in Colorado found that plants are generally three to seven years old when they produce flowers.

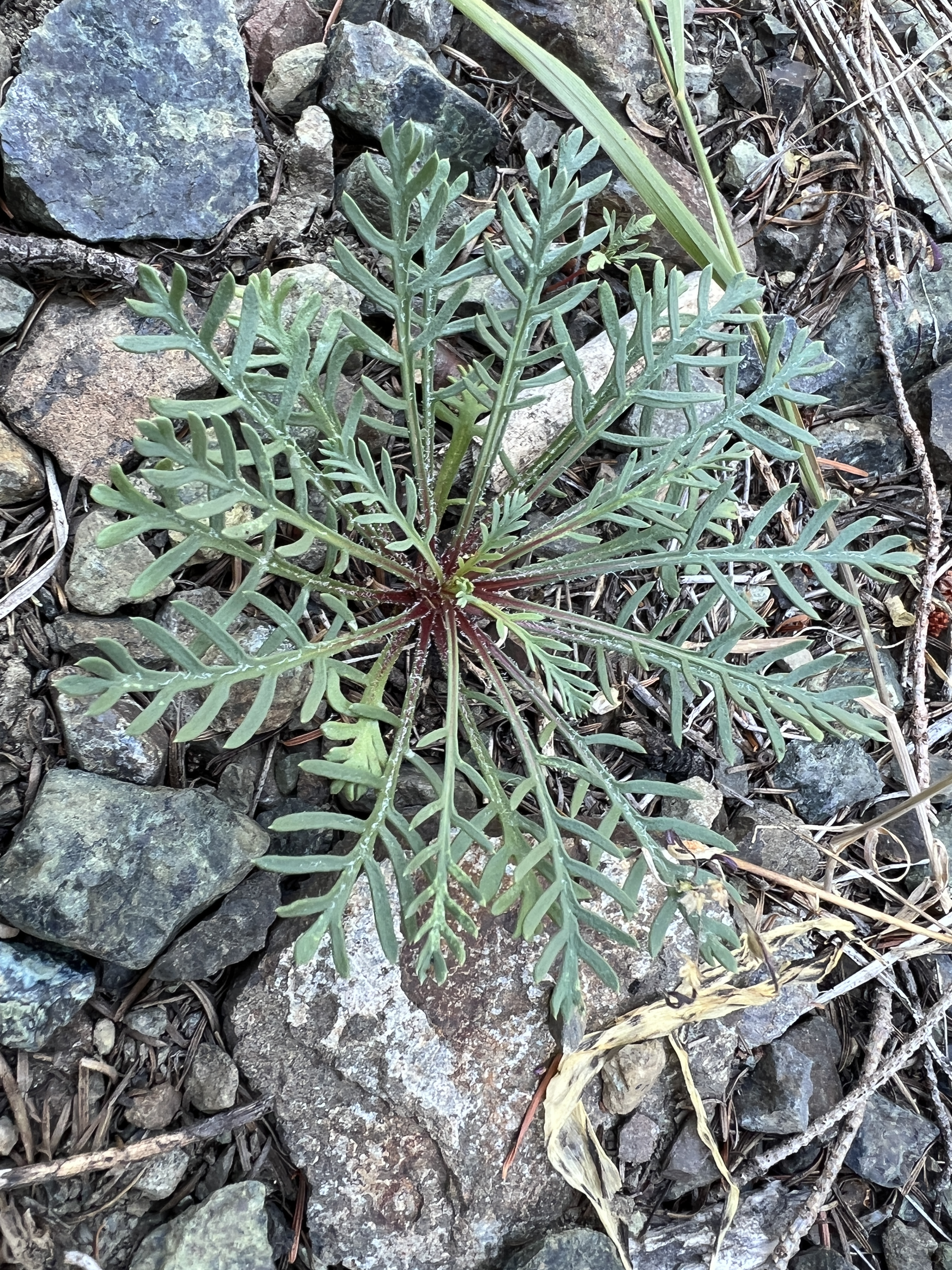
Ipomopsis aggregata young plant

=== Chemistry ===
Patuletin glycosides can be found in I. aggregata as well as eupalitin and eupatolitin.

== Taxonomy ==
When it was given its scientific name in 1814 by Frederick Pursh, the plant was placed in the genus Cantua. He described the species from a specimen collected by Meriwether Lewis on the return leg of the Corps of Discovery Expedition on Hungery Creek in what is now Idaho County, Idaho on 26 June 1806. By the time it was examined by Pursh it was in bad condition and was described as being a, "wretched scrap". It was moved to Gilia in 1824 by Kurt Sprengel and to Ipomopsis by Verne Grant in 1956. Although Grant argued for the reclassification of the species to Ipomopsis in the 1950s, athoratative sources such as the Intermountain Flora by Arthur Cronquist retained the name Gilia aggregata into the 1980s. Together with its genus it is classified in the Polemoniaceae family and has eight accepted subspecies.

- Ipomopsis aggregata subsp. aggregata – From British Columbia to northern Mexico
- Ipomopsis aggregata subsp. attenuata – Colorado & Wyoming
- Ipomopsis aggregata subsp. bridgesii – California
- Ipomopsis aggregata subsp. candida – Colorado & New Mexico
- Ipomopsis aggregata subsp. carmenensis – Coahuila
- Ipomopsis aggregata subsp. collina – Colorado & New Mexico
- Ipomopsis aggregata subsp. formosissima – Washington & Oregon to Chihuahua
- Ipomopsis aggregata subsp. weberi – Idaho, Wyoming, & Colorado

Ipomopsis aggregata has 62 synonyms of the species and six of it subspecies including 35 species names. There are eight homotypic synonyms of the species.

Table of Homotypic Synonyms
Name	Year	Rank	Notes
Batanthes aggregata (Pursh) Raf.	1832	species	
Callisteris aggregata (Pursh) Greene	1905	species	
Cantua aggregata Pursh	1813	species	
Collomia aggregata (Pursh) Porter ex A.Gray	1878	species	
Gilia aggregata (Pursh) Spreng.	1824	species	
Gilia aggregata subsp. euaggregata Brand	1907	subspecies	not validly publ.
Ipomeria aggregata (Pursh) Nutt.	1818	species	
Navarretia aggregata (Pursh) Kuntze	1891	species	

=== Names ===
The name of the accepted genus, Ipomopsis, is a Botanical Latin combination of Ipomoea with a suffix derived from the Ancient Greek ὄψις (ópsis), giving a meaning "similar to Ipomoea", the morning glories, a reference to the shape of the flowers in this genus. The species name, aggregata, is derived from Latin and means "clustered" when used in Botanical Latin, referring to how the flowers are clustered together on the flowering stems. Ipomopsis aggregata is known by many common names including scarlet skyrocket, skyrocket, scarlet gilia, skyrocket gilia, scarlet trumpet flower, desert trumpets, sky trumpet, and ruby honeysuckle. It is called skyrocket for the color and shape of the flowers evoking a firework. The name of scarlet gilia derived from the former scientific classification in the genus Gilia, which was named for the spanish botanist Filippo Luigi Gilii.

The potent unpleasant odor of produced by the leaves, especially when wet, cause it to be known as skunk flower or polecat plant. It is also called hummingbird flower, however other species such as Epilobium canum are also known by this common name and plants that are food sources for hummingbirds are generally described as hummingbird flowers.

In the Umatilla language Ipomopsis aggregata is known as qmámsali tkʷátat, meaning "hummingbird food".

== Distribution and habitat ==
Ipomopsis aggregata is native to western North America, growing mainly in mountains in the west-central to western regions and ranging from British Columbia to Mexico. In Mexico subspecies carmenensis grows in the state of Coahuila while subspecies formosissima grows in Baja California, Chihuahua, Coahuila, Durango, Nuevo León, San Luis Potosí, and Sonora.

In the United States it is a common species from the Rocky Mountains westwards. Though it is not found in the western counties of Washington or the northwest of Oregon. Similarly, it grows in the northern parts of California and the Sierra Nevada, but not in southern California, the Central Valley, or most of the Coast Ranges. It does grows in Texas, but only in the Trans-Pecos and Hutchinson, Roberts, and Lipscomb counties in the Texas panhandle. It is reported to be native to Oklahoma, but the Natural Resources Conservation Service does not report a specific location for the species. In Canada it only is native to southern British Columbia.

== Ecology ==
Ipomopsis aggregata most often visited and pollinated by and hummingbirds, with the rufous hummingbirds and calliope hummingbirds frequently seen attending the flowers in the Sierra Nevadas and broad-tailed hummingbirds the most frequent in the Rocky Mountains. In addition to hummingbirds the white-lined sphinx moth (Hyles lineata) occasionally feed from the flowers, but do not pollinate them. Other smaller moths are known to feed on the flowers near Fairplay Colorado at night and might be pollinators. Pollen collecting bees visit the flowers fairly frequently including Perdita giliae and bumblebees (Bombus). Basal leaves overwinter, even in subalpine areas of the Rocky Mountains. The plant blooms in late spring to early summer, and into fall if weather conditions are favorable. Optimal growing conditions include little water, part shade, and sandy soil. Although defined as hermaphroditic, Ipomopsis aggregata has shown sex allocation in flowering months, with phenotypic sex reaching a proportion of 0.77 female components to male.

Elk and mule deer commonly feed on I. aggregata.

=== Current research ===
The plant is currently being used to better understand pollination factors. Researchers used fluorescent particles on flowers to create pollen analogs to track pollinating hummingbirds. This ultimately gains insight into cross pollination techniques carried out by pollinating bodies. Further, it is a model for pollinator-mediated selection and spatial genetic patterns.

== Uses ==
In the traditional medicine of the Sahaptin people tribes boiled scarlet skyrocket is boiled to produce a drink for kidney health.
