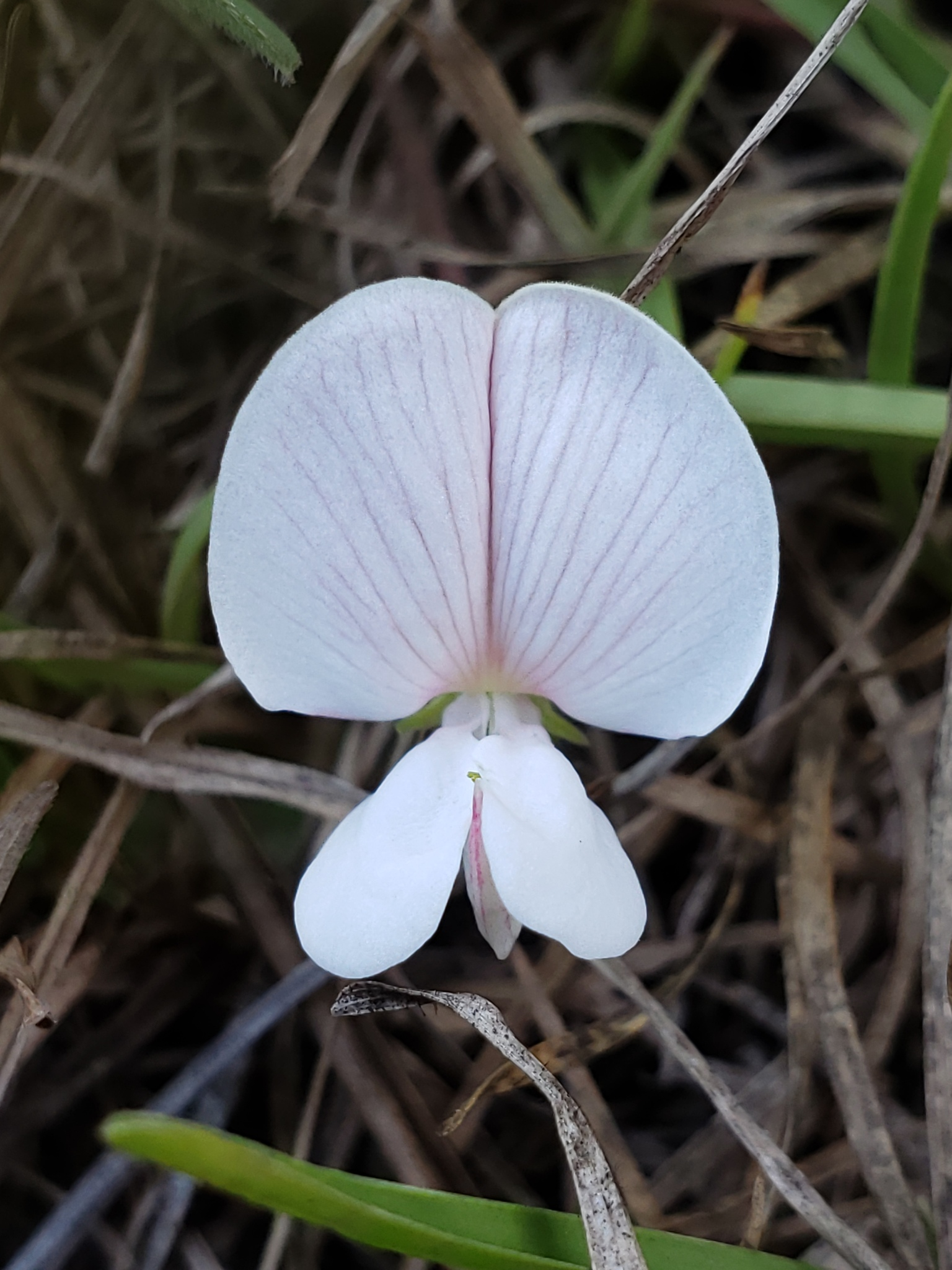
- Flower

Scientific classification
- Kingdom: Plantae
- Clade: Embryophytes
- Clade: Tracheophytes
- Clade: Spermatophytes
- Clade: Angiosperms
- Clade: Eudicots
- Clade: Rosids
- Order: Fabales
- Family: Fabaceae
- Subfamily: Faboideae
- Genus: Tephrosia
- Species: T. florida

Binomial name
- Tephrosia florida (F.Dietr.) C.E.Wood

Synonyms
- List: Cracca ambigua (M.A.Curtis) Kuntze; Cracca gracillima (B.L.Rob.) A.Heller; Galega ambigua M.A.Curtis; Galega florida F.Dietr.; Tephrosia ambigua (M.A.Curtis) D.Dietr. ex Chapm.; Tephrosia ambigua var. gracillima B.L.Rob.; Tephrosia florida var. florida; Tephrosia florida var. gracillima (B.L.Rob.) Shinners; Tephrosia gracillima (B.L.Rob.) Killip

= Tephrosia florida =

Species of flowering plant

Tephrosia florida, commonly known as Florida hoarypea or Florida goat's-rue, is a species of perennial forb endemic to the southeastern region of the United States.

== Description ==
Stems are prostrate to erect, reaching a length of up to 60 cm (24 in) and may be glabrous or strigulose. The leaves are odd-pinnate, ranging in length between 3 and 15 cm (1.2 and 5.9 in). Leaflets number between 7 and 19 (rarely 1 to 41), are cuneate-oblong or narrowly to widely elliptic in shape, reaching between 1 and 5 cm (0.4 and 2.0 in) in length.

Principal inflorescence occurs opposite the leaves, and reach a length between 2 and 23 cm (0.8 and 9.1 in). The corolla are initially white to yellow in coloration, transitioning over time to pink and purple. T. florida flower from May through July.

The legumes of T. florida range between 3 and 5 cm (1.2 and 2.0 in) in length and are sparsely to moderately pubescent, with trichomes 0.5 cm (0.2 in) or less in length.

== Distribution and habitat ==
Tephrosia florida's native range occurs within the United States' coastal plain region, from North Carolina to Florida and stretching westward to Louisiana.

This species may be found in habitats such as pine savannas and other pineland environments.
