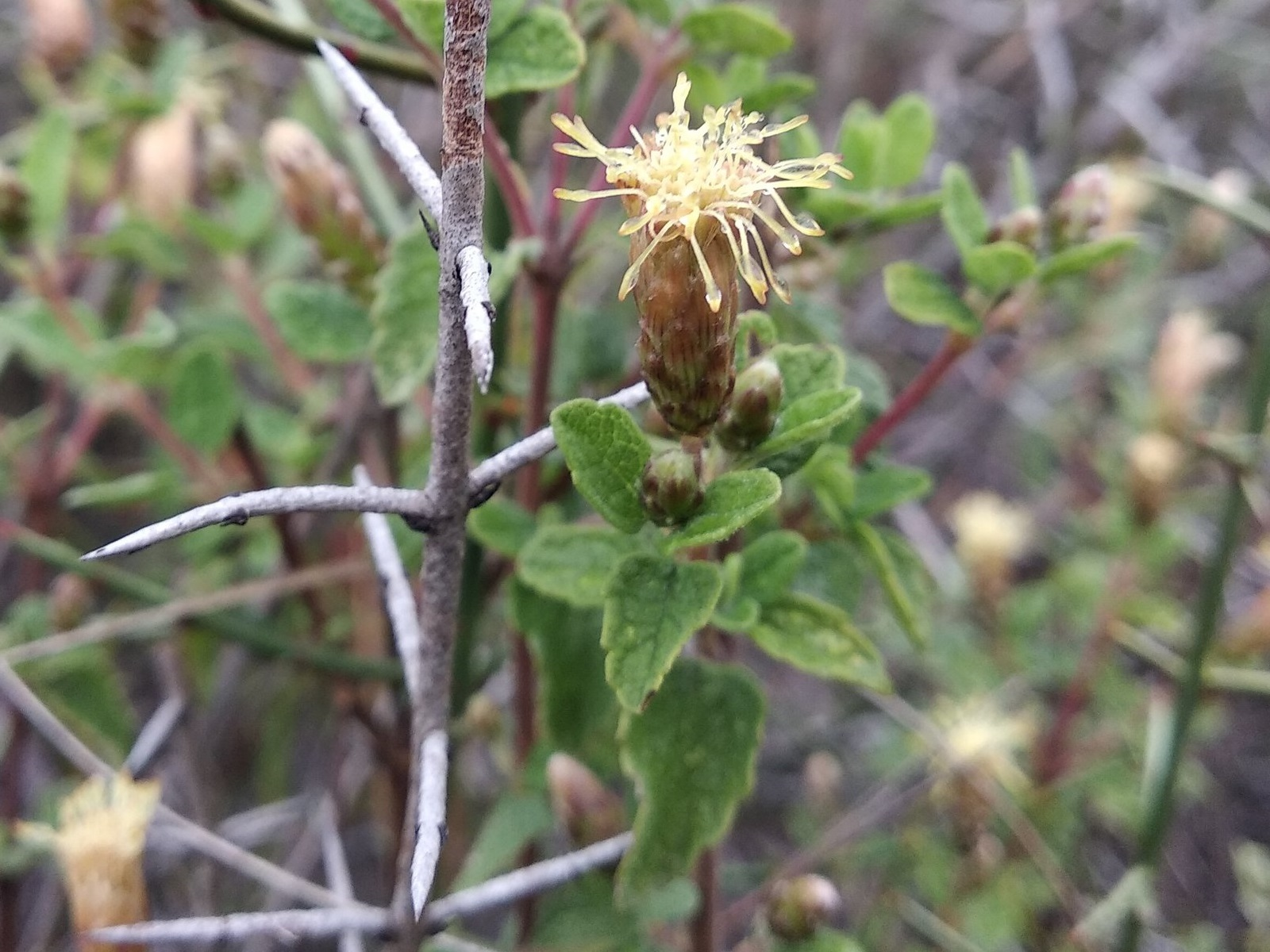

Scientific classification
- Kingdom: Plantae
- Clade: Tracheophytes
- Clade: Angiosperms
- Clade: Eudicots
- Clade: Asterids
- Order: Asterales
- Family: Asteraceae
- Genus: Brickellia
- Species: B. veronicifolia

Binomial name
- Brickellia veronicifolia (Kunth) A.Gray

Synonyms
- Brickellia veronicaefolia (Kunth) A.Gray; Eupatorium veronicifolium Kunth; Eupatorium veronicaefolium Kunth

= Brickellia veronicifolia =

Species of flowering plant

Brickellia veronicifolia is a North American species of plants in the family Asteraceae. It is widespread across much of Mexico, from Chihuahua to Oaxaca. In the United States, it very rare, found only in the Chisos Mountains inside Big Bend National Park in Texas, and also in Otero County in New Mexico.

Brickellia veronicifolia is a shrub up to 90 cm (3 feet) tall. It produces large numbers of small, pale yellow or cream-colored flower heads.

Brickellia veronicifolia contains high amounts of essential oils, Germacrene D, a natural insecticide and the two flavonoids brickellin and eupatolitin.
