= Eupatolin =

- Chemical structure of eupatolin

Names
- IUPAC name 3′,4′,5-Trihydroxy-6,7-dimethoxy-3-(α-L-rhamnopyranosyloxy)flavone
- Preferred IUPAC name 2-(3,4-Dihydroxyphenyl)-5-hydroxy-6,7-dimethoxy-3-{[(2S,3R,4R,5R,6S)-3,4,5-trihydroxy-6-methyloxan-2-yl]oxy}-4H-1-benzopyran-4-one
- Other names 2-(3,4-Dihydroxyphenyl)-5-hydroxy-6,7-dimethoxy-3-[(2S,3R,4R,5R,6S)-3,4,5-trihydroxy-6-methyloxan-2-yl]oxychromen-4-one

Identifiers
CAS Number	29725-50-6
3D model (JSmol)	Interactive image
ChemSpider	4476178
PubChem CID	5317290
UNII	RE3LW4CY9C
CompTox Dashboard (EPA)	DTXSID20552970
- InChI: InChI=1S/C23H24O12/c1-8-15(26)18(29)19(30)23(33-8)35-22-17(28)14-12(7-13(31-2)21(32-3)16(14)27)34-20(22)9-4-5-10(24)11(25)6-9/h4-8,15,18-19,23-27,29-30H,1-3H3/t8-,15+,18-,19-,23+/m1/s1 Key: NVZCGVLCUJLTSA-CTQDKRGWSA-N; InChI=1/C23H24O12/c1-8-15(26)18(29)19(30)23(33-8)35-22-17(28)14-12(7-13(31-2)21(32-3)16(14)27)34-20(22)9-4-5-10(24)11(25)6-9/h4-8,15,18-19,23-27,29-30H,1-3H3/t8-,15+,18-,19-,23+/m1/s1 Key: NVZCGVLCUJLTSA-CTQDKRGWBF
- SMILES: C[C@@H]1[C@@H]([C@H]([C@H]([C@@H](O1)Oc2c(=O)c3c(cc(c(c3O)OC)OC)oc2c4ccc(c(c4)O)O)O)O)O

Properties
Chemical formula	C_{23}H_{24}O_{12}
Molar mass	492.433 g·mol^{−1}
- Except where otherwise noted, data are given for materials in their standard state (at 25 °C [77 °F], 100 kPa). verify (what is ?) Infobox references

Eupatolin is a chemical compound. It is a flavonol rhamnoside attached at the 3 position to an eupatolitin molecule. It can be found in Eupatorium ligustrinum.
