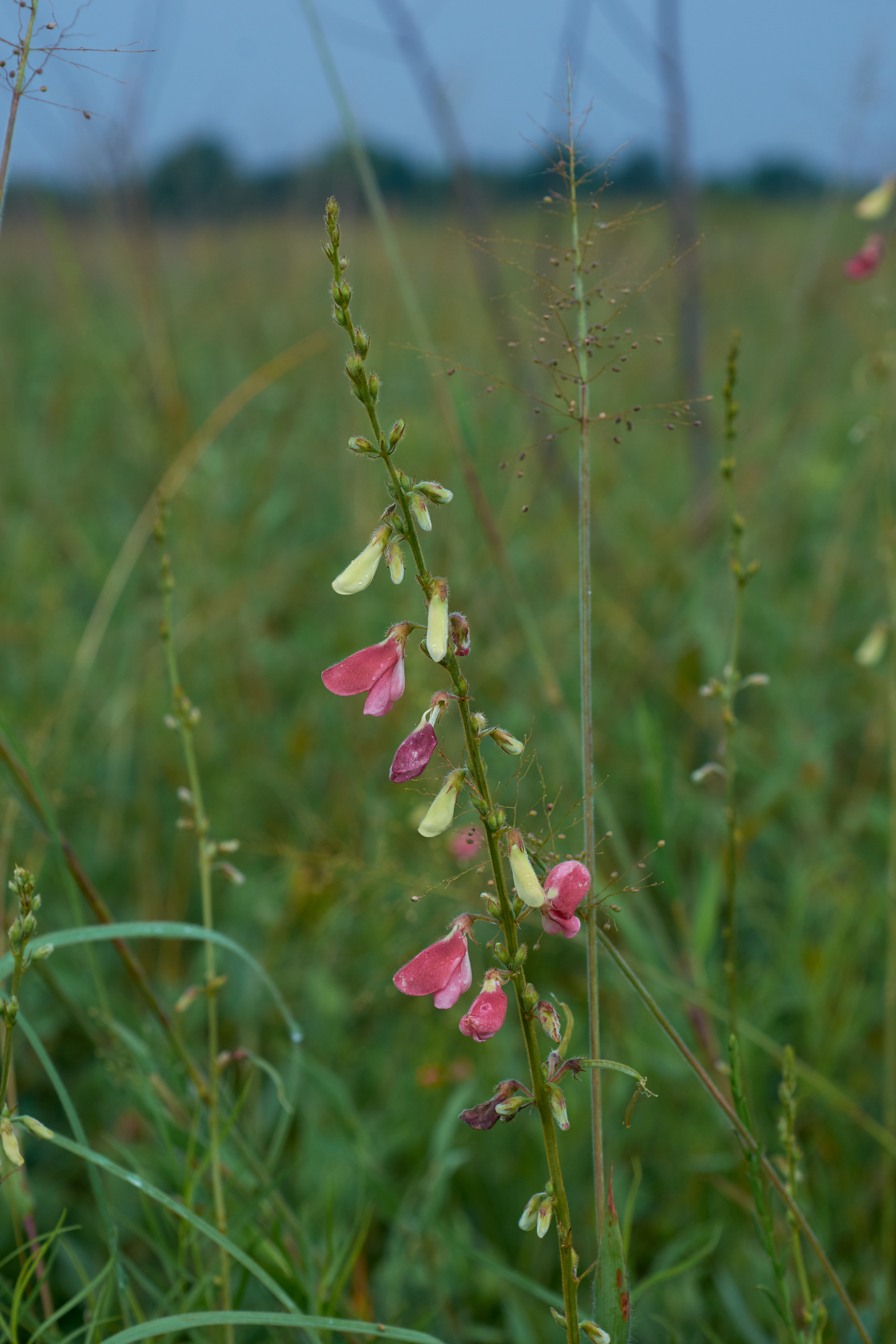

Conservation status
- Apparently Secure (NatureServe)

Scientific classification
- Kingdom: Plantae
- Clade: Tracheophytes
- Clade: Angiosperms
- Clade: Eudicots
- Clade: Rosids
- Order: Fabales
- Family: Fabaceae
- Subfamily: Faboideae
- Genus: Tephrosia
- Species: T. onobrychoides

Binomial name
- Tephrosia onobrychoides (Nutt.)

= Tephrosia onobrychoides =

Species of legume

Tephrosia onobrychoides, commonly called multi-bloom hoary pea, is a species of plant in the pea family that is native to Texas, Louisiana, Arkansas, Oklahoma, Mississippi, and Alabama in the United States of America.
