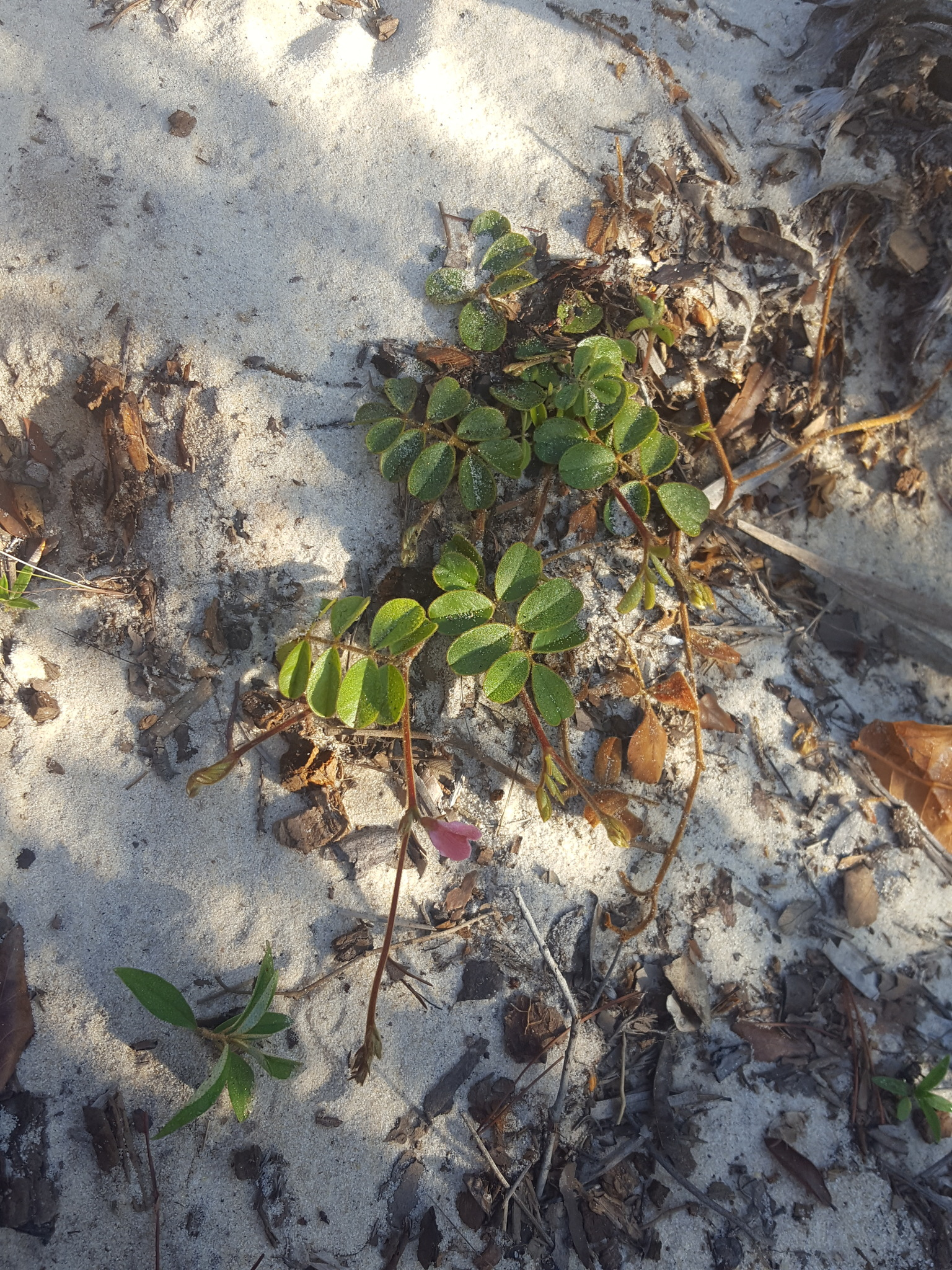

Scientific classification
- Kingdom: Plantae
- Clade: Tracheophytes
- Clade: Angiosperms
- Clade: Eudicots
- Clade: Rosids
- Order: Fabales
- Family: Fabaceae
- Subfamily: Faboideae
- Genus: Tephrosia
- Species: T. mysteriosa

Binomial name
- Tephrosia mysteriosa DeLaney

= Tephrosia mysteriosa =

Species of legume

Tephrosia mysteriosa, commonly known as sandhill tippitoes, is a species of legume first described by Kris DeLaney in 2010. It grows on sandhills and is endemic to the Lake Wales and Mount Dora Ridges of Florida.

DeLaney collected the type specimen on August 3, 2006, in Carter Creek Preserve, Highlands County, Florida. Each stem of the specimen has up to 9–13 leaflets.

== Description ==
The stems of Tephrosia mysteriosa are prostrate, covered with trichomes (indumentum), and tawny. There are typically 7–11 leaflets per stem; these are approximately 0.5 inches (1.3 cm) long and 0.375 inches (0.95 cm) wide. The leaflets are olive green and elliptical, with strigose hairs on the underside. T. mysteriosa blooms from May to October, with its red buds opening to flowers that are white to light pink in color.
