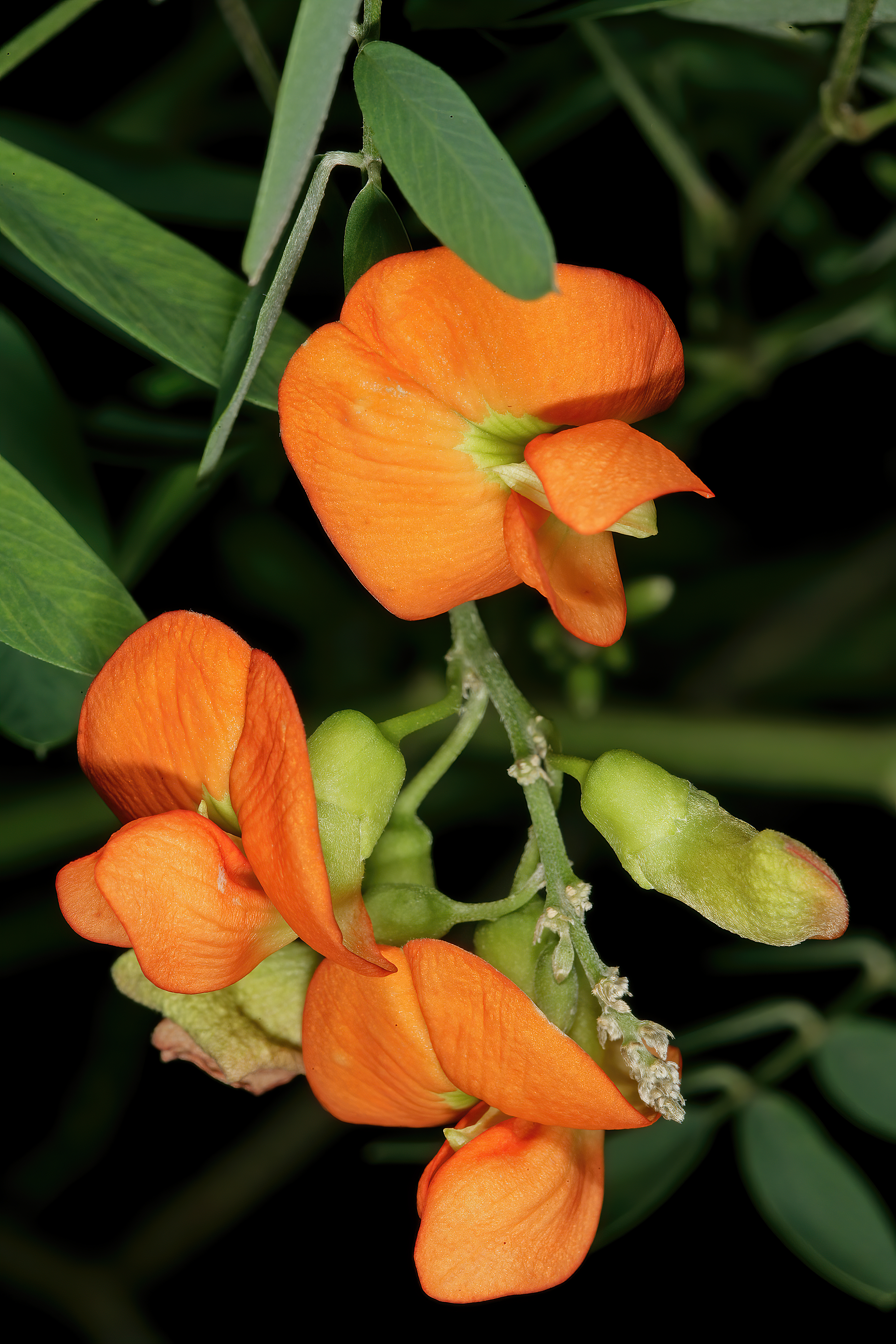

Conservation status
- Vulnerable (IUCN 2.3)

Scientific classification
- Kingdom: Plantae
- Clade: Tracheophytes
- Clade: Angiosperms
- Clade: Eudicots
- Clade: Rosids
- Order: Fabales
- Family: Fabaceae
- Subfamily: Faboideae
- Genus: Tephrosia
- Species: T. pondoensis

Binomial name
- Tephrosia pondoensis (Codd) Schrire

= Tephrosia pondoensis =

Species of legume

Tephrosia pondoensis (pondo poison pea, Afrikaans: Pondo-Gifertjie) is a species of plant in the family Fabaceae. It is found only in the Cape Provinces of South Africa, where it is protected under the National Forest Act (Act 84) of 1998. The pondo poison pea is threatened by habitat loss.
