= Tephrosia socotrana =

Conservation status
- Vulnerable (IUCN 3.1)

Scientific classification
- Kingdom: Plantae
- Clade: Tracheophytes
- Clade: Angiosperms
- Clade: Eudicots
- Clade: Rosids
- Order: Fabales
- Family: Fabaceae
- Subfamily: Faboideae
- Genus: Tephrosia
- Species: T. socotrana

Binomial name
- Tephrosia socotrana M.Thulin

Species of legume

Tephrosia socotrana is a species of plant in the family Fabaceae.

== Distribution ==
The plant is endemic to the East African island of Socotra in the Red Sea, that is politically a territory within West Asian Yemen.

Its natural habitat is rocky areas on the island.

=== Conservation ===
Tephrosia socotrana is an IUCN Red List vulnerable species
