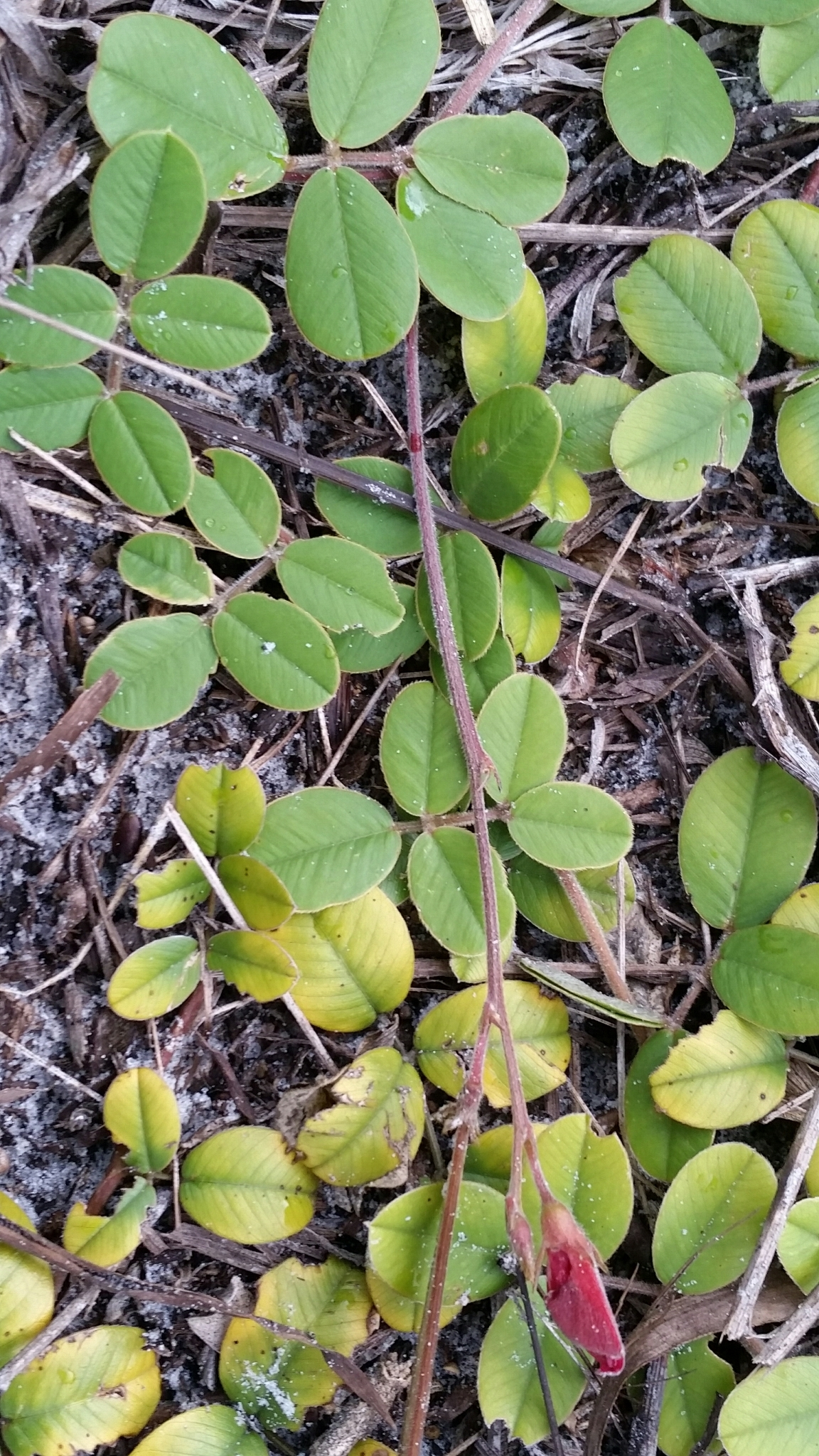

Conservation status
- Apparently Secure (NatureServe)

Scientific classification
- Kingdom: Plantae
- Clade: Embryophytes
- Clade: Tracheophytes
- Clade: Angiosperms
- Clade: Eudicots
- Clade: Rosids
- Order: Fabales
- Family: Fabaceae
- Subfamily: Faboideae
- Genus: Tephrosia
- Species: T. chrysophylla

Binomial name
- Tephrosia chrysophylla Pursh

= Tephrosia chrysophylla =

Species of legume

Tephrosia chrysophylla, commonly known as scurf hoarypea, is a species of flowering plant in the family Fabaceae native to Florida. It is a perennial dicot with red flowers and compound alternating leaves.
