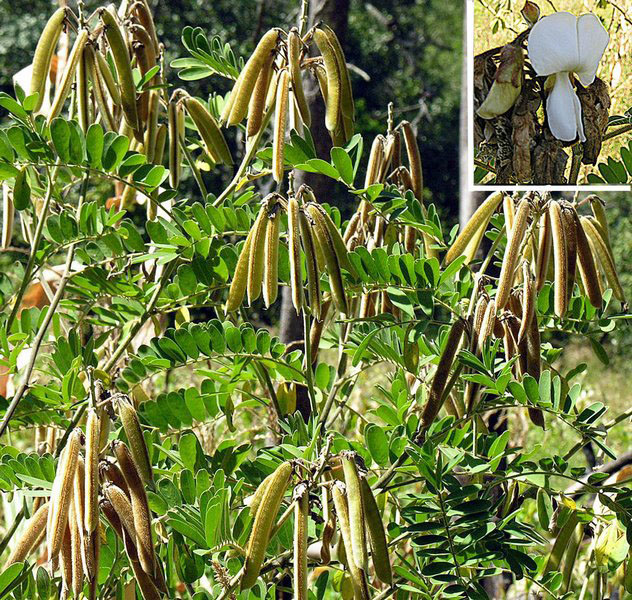

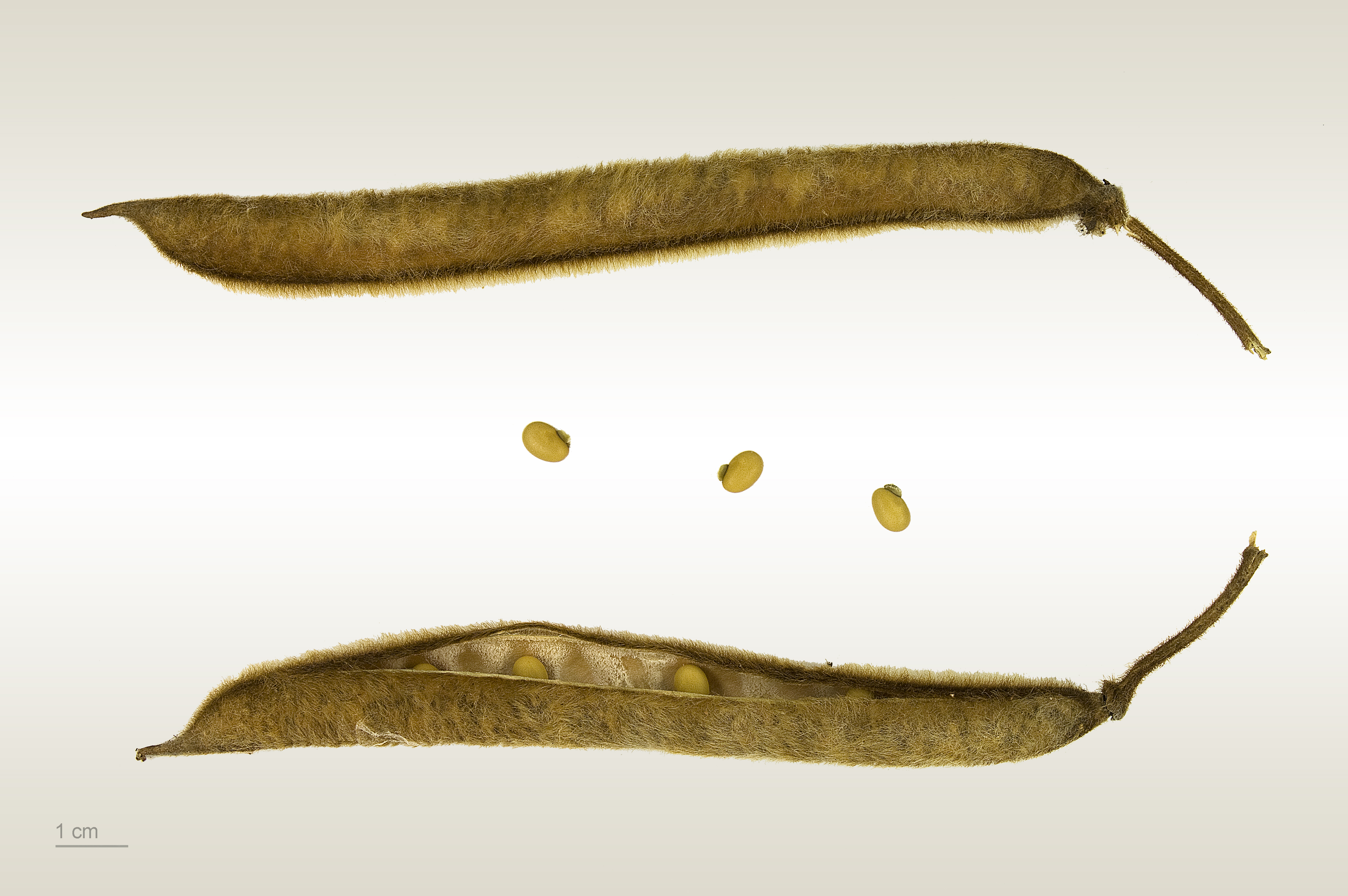

Scientific classification
- Kingdom: Plantae
- Clade: Tracheophytes
- Clade: Angiosperms
- Clade: Eudicots
- Clade: Rosids
- Order: Fabales
- Family: Fabaceae
- Subfamily: Faboideae
- Genus: Tephrosia
- Species: T. vogelii

Binomial name
- Tephrosia vogelii Hook.f.

Synonyms
- Cracca vogelii (Hook. f.) Kuntze

= Tephrosia vogelii =

Species of legume

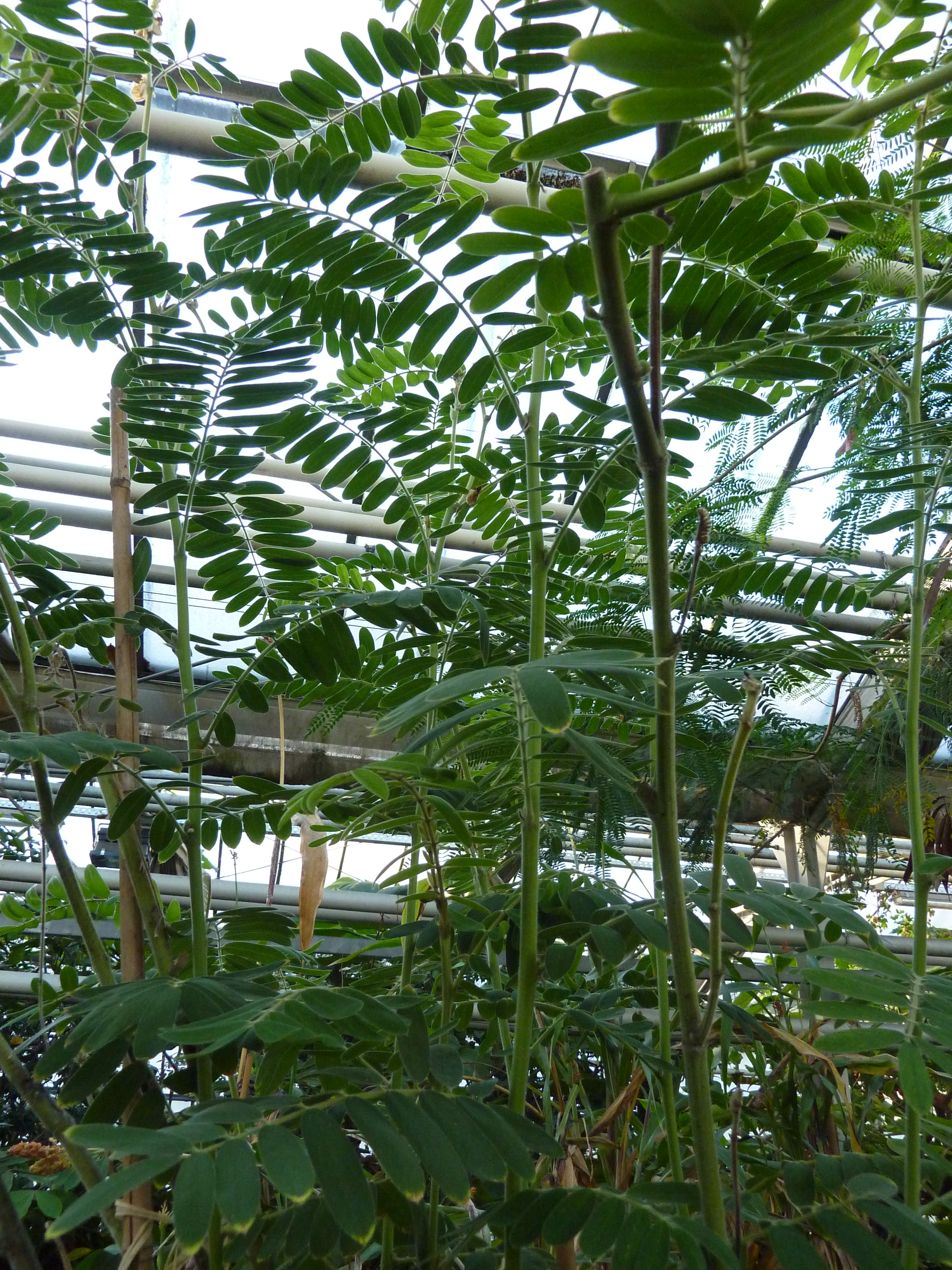
Plants growing in a greenhouse

Tephrosia vogelii, the Vogel's tephrosia, fish-poison-bean or Vogel tephrosia (English), tefrósia (Portuguese) or barbasco guineano (Spanish), is a flowering plant species in the genus Tephrosia.

It is a herb or small tree that is native to tropical Africa and has also been used in tropical America as well as South and Southeast Asia. It is commonly used to deter pests and diseases, specifically fleas and ticks on animals. It is not suitable for livestock or human consumption because it is not highly nutritious and can be poisonous for fish and some other animals. Since it is a nitrogen-fixing plant, it can be intercropped with other plants and used as a source of green manure.

Tephrosia vogelii is commonly known as the “fish bean”, “fish-poison bean”, or “vogel’s tephrosia”. It is a small tree used by farmers in numerous countries in Africa to get rid of pests on livestock, control pests in cultivated fields as an organic pesticide, improves soil fertility, as a medicine for skin diseases and internal worms, and for storage of crops. The use of “Tephrosia leaf extract as a low cost acaricide is spreading to farmers in central Kenya” and has been very successful in terms of its results.

== Description ==
Tephrosia vogelii is a soft, woody herb with dense foliage. It stands 0.5–4 m tall, and contains stems and branches with short and long white or rusty brown hairs. Long, narrow leaves branch out from stems, as well as sack like shapes that contain the seeds of the plant for reproduction.

== History, geography and ethnography ==
Tephrosia vogelii is native to tropical Africa. It was introduced as a cover crop in tropical America as well as South and Southeast Asia. In 1908, it was introduced to Java and is now grown and found throughout regions of Malesia. In Sub-Saharan Africa, Tephrosia vogelii is a wild growing plant. Traditionally in Kenya, it has been used by Samburu and Maasai pastoralists to get rid of ticks on their livestock. Recently, it has been investigated for its use within smallscale dairy herds in Mashonaland Central Province in Zimbabwe. Striking similarities have been found between Tephrosia extract and Triatix dip, which is the most common conventional acaricide. Research has revealed that there is no difference between the two, and Tephrosia has been recommended for smallscale farmers in regions where veterinary drugs are not readily available.

== Growing conditions ==
When it comes to its growing conditions, Tephrosia vogelii comes with many benefits. Firstly, it only takes three months to mature. It is also good as a shade or boundary crop and can be planted between rows of other plants or around the circumference. Planting of Tephrosia should be done at the beginning or middle of the rainy season in the region.

It is found in various habitats and can adapt to many different climates and weather types. Tephrosia is grown in vegetations similar to the savannah, grassland areas, forest margina, shrubland, wasteland and fallow fields. Since it is highly adaptable, this plant a great option to grow in most areas. Tephrosia reproduces through seeds. Without pesticide and chemical treatment, the seedling survival rate is 60%. Germination is stimulated when it is soaked in warm water. Since it grows slowly, it does not compete with maize or other crops, though there may be some competition with weeds. Planting stations require weeding and care during the beginning of the growth period. It is tolerant to pruning, drought, strong wind, and grazing. However, drought often stops it from re-sprouting, so the more water it has, the more successful it will be for future use.

== Stress tolerance ==
Tephrosia grows better in acidic soils, and forms root nodules while fixing atmospheric nitrogen. It grows more slowly in poor soils and is also more prone to diseases, though it is still typically fairly successful. It grows best where the average temperature sits between 12 and 27 degrees Celsius which is a moderate temperature and makes this plant adaptable in many places. It needs about 850–2650 mm of rainfall annually on average. It grows well on andosols soil type which is not subject to flooding. This unique plant is also tolerant to poor soils with a low pH though it is not the best for it.

== Uses of Tephrosia ==
Tephrosia can be used for various purposes besides human and livestock consumption which makes it a diverse and helpful plant. Its most common use is for organic tick control. First, leaves from the Tephrosia plant are ground up and a juice is extracted which is then used on the animal. The green liquid from the plant is mixed with water and is then applied to the animal's skin with a piece of cloth or a sponge. A little bit of soap can be added to the liquid to make it stick to the skin. Usually it is left on the animal for a week after which results appear. It is only effective against ticks that still have soft skin and are immature. This is a great practice for farmers that do not have access to veterinary medicine. Tephrosia can also be used as a fish poison, because chemicals in the plant react to chemicals in the fish and stupefy them so they can be easily caught.

Tephrosia vogelii is not used for human or livestock consumption, although another great use is for a natural, organic pesticide on farmer's crops. Its leaves contain high amounts of nutrients, including nitrogen, which is important for good plant development 3. When Tephrosia plants are cut down, the leaves are worked into the soil and the nutrients can then be used by the plants that are grown in the field after.

Although Tephrosia vogelii is not consumed directly, it can be used to increase the yield of various crops. For example, leaf extracts of Tephrosia vogelii are used as chemical pesticides. Crops that have had this extract applied show significant decreases in insect and other pest activity. Therefore, crops can grow in areas that they could not before, if they are grown alongside Tephrosia vogelii. In fact, studies have shown a 46.2-52.2% decrease in grain damage. Grain damage was measured by the amount of kernels that were destroyed and also by the net weight loss of the crop. This number varies based on method of storage, type of insect measured, and type of stored grain. In one particular study, the extract killed 40% of the attacking insects after a 21-day period. This decrease is about what would be expected from most chemical pesticides.

However, insecticide is not its only use. Tephrosia vogelii can also increase various nutrients in the soil and is often used in intercropping. Studies have shown a 30% increase in soil nutrients, and as a result, a 23-26% greater crop yield. Tephrosia treatments increased organic carbon and mineral nitrogen in the soil. The experiment that discovered this used pots with various concentration of Tephrosia vogelii to be grown along with corn. The pots that contained Tephrosia showed a large increase in nitrogen and carbon. To determine this, researchers used weeds and insects to measure nitrogen and potassium content of the soil, respectively. Therefore, a well designed intercropping system could dramatically increase crop production in arid land. Normally, if different crops are grown together, there is less yield than if they were grown alone, but when grown together with Tephrosia, the crop yield increased. This shows that Tephrosia vogelii has a synergistic effect with multiple crops including coffee and corn. Increased nutrients are yet another way Tephrosia vogelii can improve the yield of other crops. Tephrosia might not grow well alone, but if it is grown along with another crop, it can grow up to 6 times more than it would alone. Its poor growth is often due to the high acidity of the soil, as well as low calcium, low sodium, and low potassium.

Although an increase in organic carbon is important, the main function of Tephrosia vogelii is to increase nitrogen content in the soil. This increase can be measured using organisms that feed off the nitrogen. However, as this is not a direct measurement, the crop yield might be over or underestimated. Tephrosia vogelii can be used in any environment, but it is best used in an arid environment such as southern and eastern Africa where crops are extremely difficult to grow alone. Using it, farmers can maximize the amount of crop yield by increasing soil fertility and removing insects and other pests. If this species is developed further, it might be able to provide an even greater synergistic effect and crop yield in these arid environments.

== Economics ==
Though this plant is not typically used for trade or profit, it is very economical to the farmers themselves. The affordability of Tephrosia makes it very attractive to subsistence and small scale farmers who raise livestock. Tephrosia vogelii seeds are typically sold for around $0.20 per kilo, which is very inexpensive compared to most other crop seeds offered on the market. In Kenya specifically it is readily available at the Kenya Organic Agricultural Network offices and KIOF.

== Constraints to wider adoption ==
One limitation to this crop is that because it is used as a fish poison and is poisonous to various species, the Kenyan authorities have banned its cultivation near large bodies of water. This means that people that live in coastal areas cannot grow this crop close to where they live because of its dangers to the lives of marine animals.

Tephrosia is not adopted in a more broad spectrum due to the fact that it is not for livestock or human consumption. If it had nutritional values and was safe to eat, it might be more commonly grown or sold for profit. Because it is mainly used to deter pests from livestock, it is often forgotten about when farmers think about planting or adapting to new crops to plant. This is a disadvantage because Tephrosia would be a very helpful crop if more farmers knew about it.

== Practical information ==
This plant can be very useful for farmers as it can help improve soil fertility, rid pests from storage crops and livestock, and can be used as a pesticide on other crops in the field. Planting seeds is easy after the simple germination process. The plant only takes 3 months to mature, and seeds can be collected from trees between July and September typically by picking the brown pods with ripe seeds. They can be easily stored which is another advantage for farmers and can be spread on other crops to protect them from pests while they are also in storage. It is a cheap solution for farmers without access to veterinary medicine, and can ensure protection of their domestic animals. For more information on this topic, there are various online resources that can be used, specifically in the New Agriculturalist or paceproject.net.
