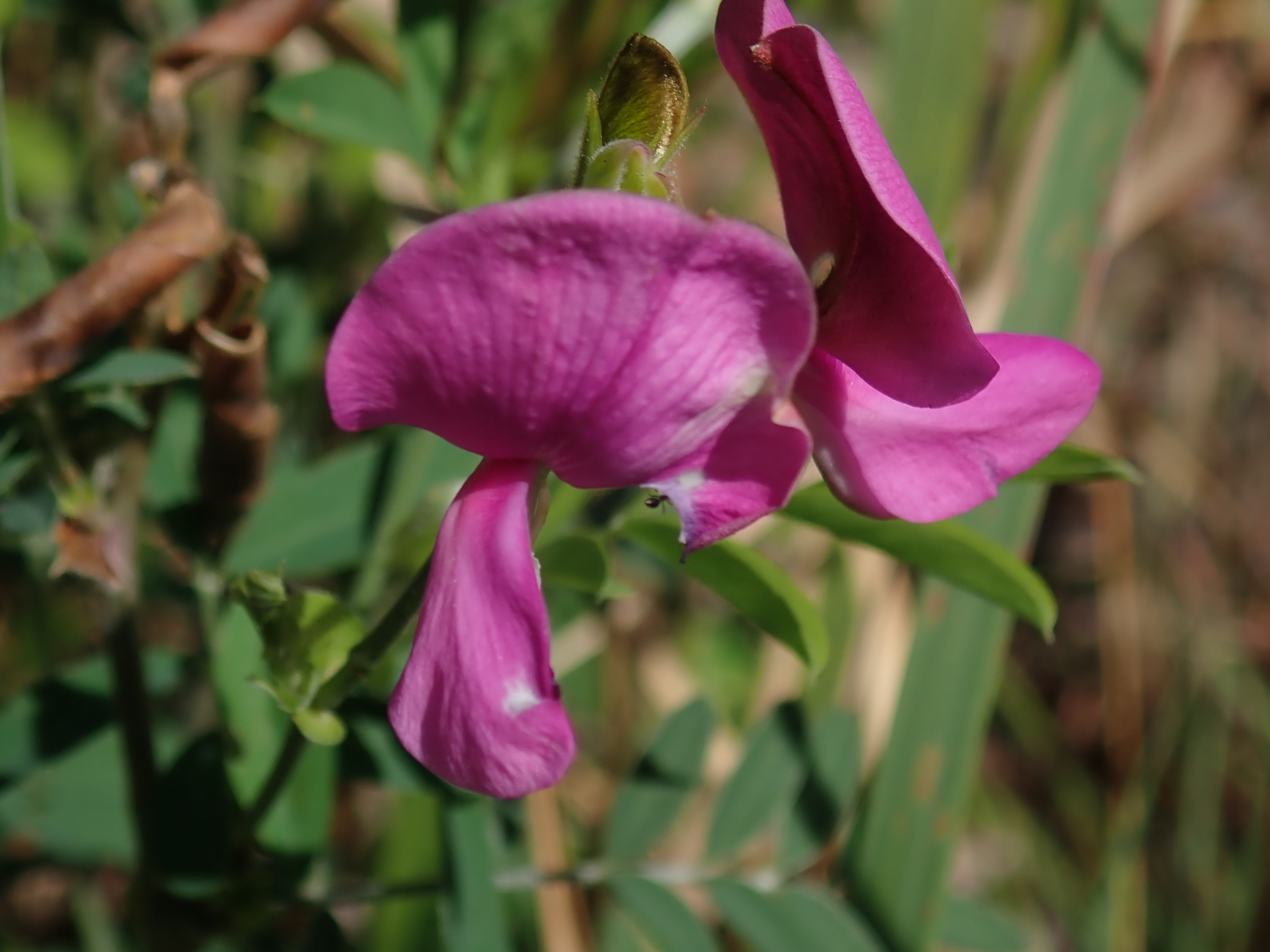

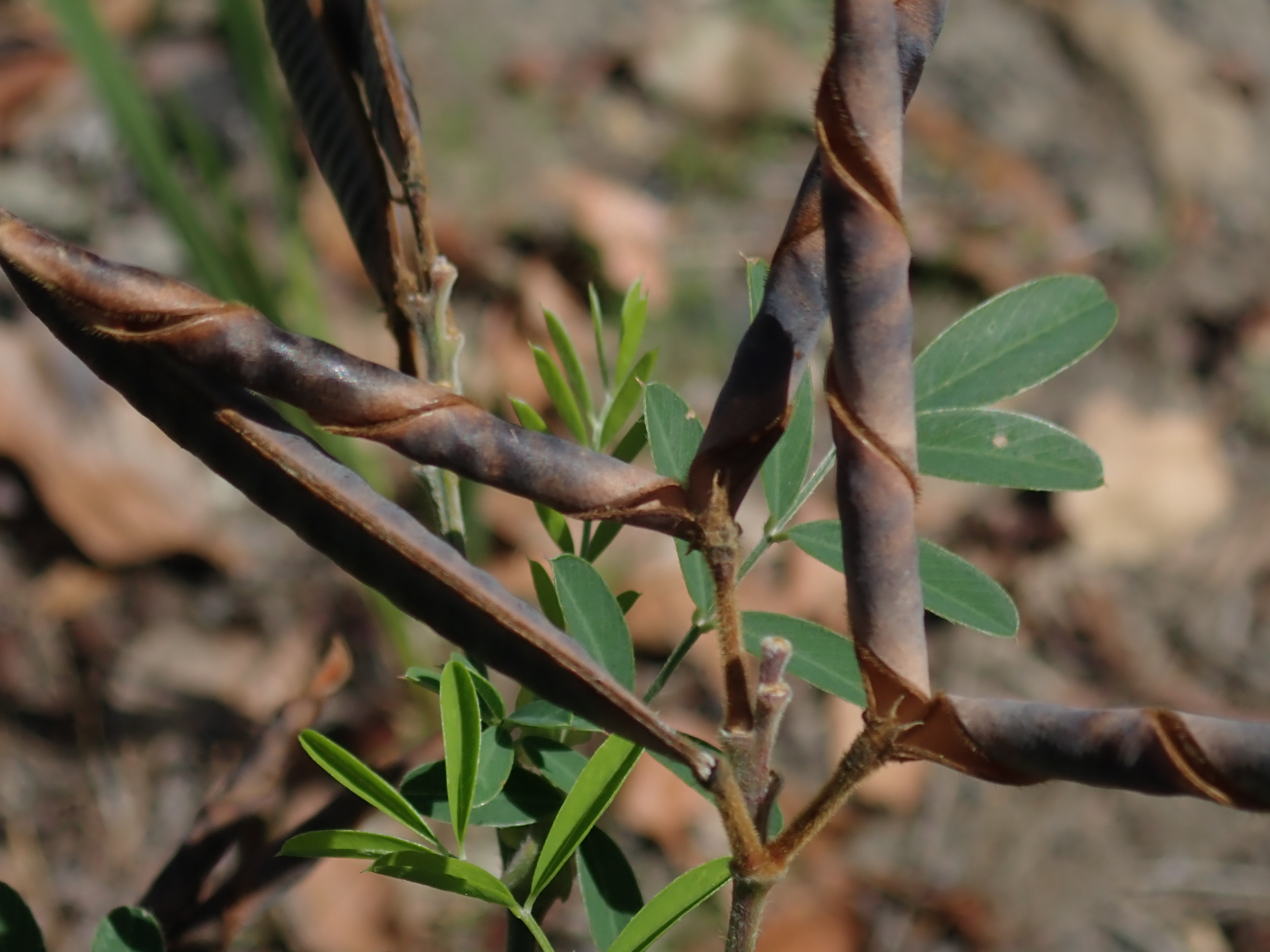

Scientific classification
- Kingdom: Plantae
- Clade: Tracheophytes
- Clade: Angiosperms
- Clade: Eudicots
- Clade: Rosids
- Order: Fabales
- Family: Fabaceae
- Subfamily: Faboideae
- Genus: Tephrosia
- Species: T. glomeruliflora

Binomial name
- Tephrosia glomeruliflora Meisn.

Synonyms
- Cracca glomeruliflora (Meisn.) Kuntze

= Tephrosia glomeruliflora =

Species of legume

Tephrosia glomeruliflora, or pink tephrosia, is a perennial (non-climbing) herb in the family Fabaceae, endemic to South Africa (native to Zimbabwe, South Africa and Eswatini). It is also found on the eastern coast of Australia, in New South Wales and Queensland, where it is considered an environmental weed.

== Description ==
Tephrosia glomeruliflora is an erect shrub growing to 1–2 m high. Its branches are hairy with the hairs lying close to the branch. The pinnate leaves are 5–12 cm long; and there are 11-21 leaflets which are 15–40 mm long and 5–10 mm wide with an obtuse apex finishing in a tiny sharp point. The upper surface of the leaflets is sparsely hairy with the hairs pressed close to the leaflet, and the lower surface is silky-hairy. The petiole is 10–20 mm long. The stipules are ovate and 6–10 mm long. It flowers in terminal racemes, with clusters of buds enclosed on broad bracts. The calyx is silvery (from the hairs) and 4–5 mm long, with teeth which are 1–1.5 mm long. The corolla is 15–20 mm long and pink to mauve. The pod is 5–7 cm long and 7–9 mm wide, and smooth except for the hairy sutures.

== Etymology ==
The genus name, Tephrosia, derives from the Greek tephros (ash-coloured) and refers to the fact that most of the species are covered with grey hairs. The species epithet, glomeruliflora, derives from the Latin, glomerulus, (clusters of flowers subtended by a bract), and flos (flower).

== Habitat ==
In Africa, it grows in grasslands.
