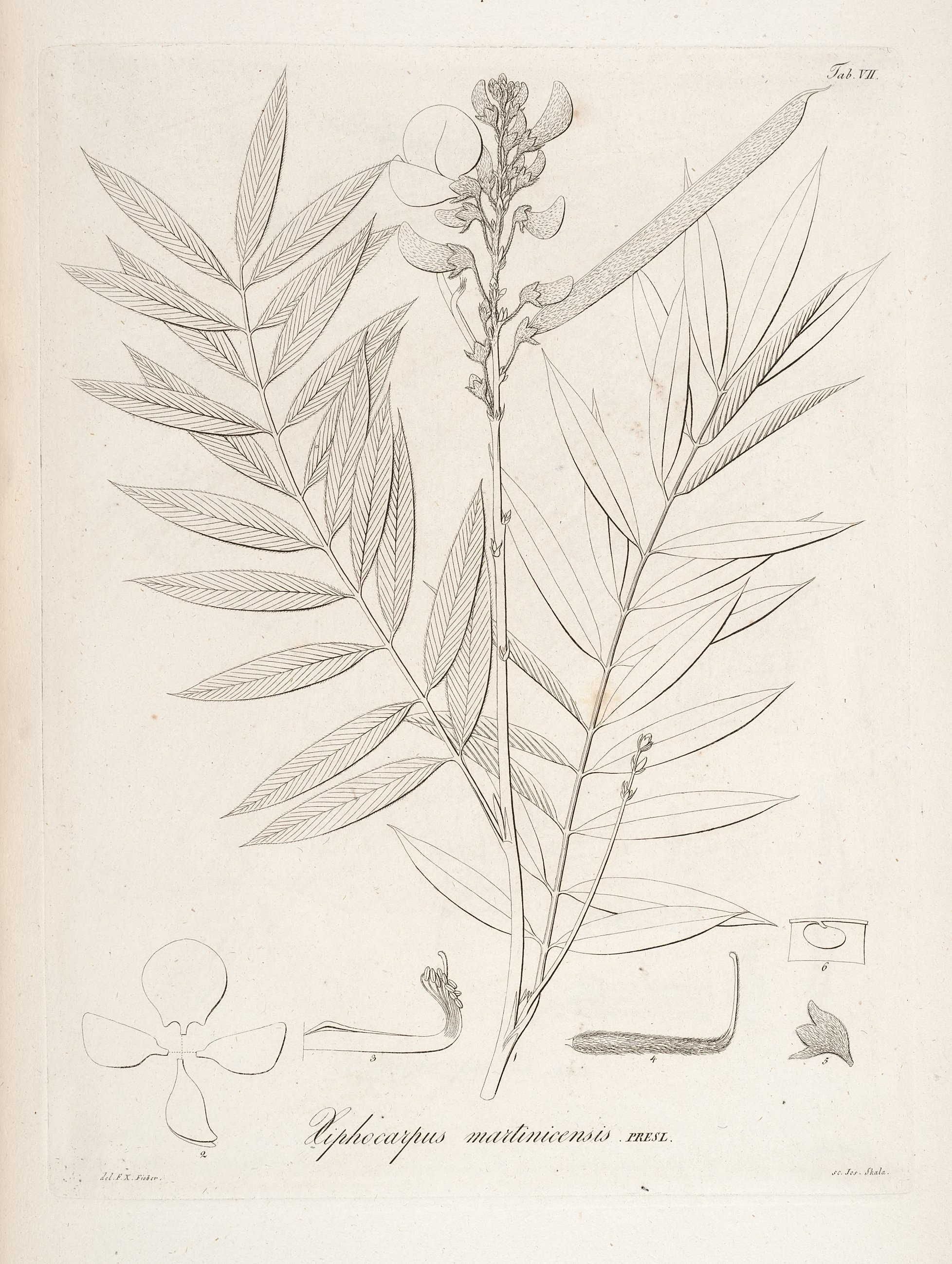
- As Xiphocarpus martinicensis C. Presl

Scientific classification
- Kingdom: Plantae
- Clade: Tracheophytes
- Clade: Angiosperms
- Clade: Eudicots
- Clade: Rosids
- Order: Fabales
- Family: Fabaceae
- Subfamily: Faboideae
- Genus: Tephrosia
- Species: T. candida

Binomial name
- Tephrosia candida DC.

Synonyms
- Cracca candida (DC.) Kuntze; Kiesera sericea Reinw. ex Blume; Lonchocarpus fruticosus Span.; Robinia candida (DC.) Roxb.; Robinia javanica Zipp. ex Miq.; Robinia leucantha Zipp. ex Miq.; Robinia sericea Sieber ex C.Presl; Tephrosia sericea Zoll. & Moritzi; Xiphocarpus candidus (DC.) Endl.; Xiphocarpus martinicensis C.Presl

= Tephrosia candida =

Species of plant

Tephrosia candida, the white hoarypea, is a perennial shrub, native to India, in the legume family. It has been introduced to Malesia, South America, Africa, South East Asia and Australia.

== Etymology ==
The genus name, Tephrosia, derives from the Greek tephros (ash-coloured) and refers to the fact that most of the species are covered with grey hairs. The species epithet, candida, derives from the Latin adjective, candidus,-a,-um, meaning pure white.

== Agricultural benefits ==
In Zimbabwe, the use of different taxa of the genus Tephrosia has been studied as a way to enrich soils by intercropping when growing maize. This allows continual nourishment of the soil. Specifically, T. candida was proven to successfully grow in conditions of high population density, yet further research into this growth option is required. To further investigate the genus Tephrosia and its effective growth in stressful habitats, researchers at the University of Zimbabwe studied carbon and nitrogen mineralization patterns of this legume. Mineralization, or the decomposition of organic matter, provides fixed nitrogen for other plants to use. They found that Tephrosia released nitrogen at a slow rate. This pattern could be due to nitrogen binding to polyphenols, or natural organic molecules. This prevents subsequent loss of nitrogen and promotes crop uptake along with nitrogen release. Polyphenol to nitrogen ratios within plants can give evidence toward the quality of biomass and can predict the nitrogen release pattern. While there exist several Tephrosia taxa that exhibit slow nitrogen release, many possess rapid rates of nitrogen release as well. Rapid release is not necessarily compatible with intercropping because it does not share this pattern with maize. However, the slow release of nitrogen in the T. candida species is able to synchronize with the nitrogen demand of maize, benefiting the remaining maize in the following season. Other benefits of T. candida include higher biomass production, nematode resistance, closed canopy growth and weed suppression.

== Introduced/invasive ==
It is on the Global Register of Introduced and Invasive Species for the following countries and islands: Brazil, Palau, Samoa, Cook Islands, Federated States of Micronesia (Pohnpei, Yap and State of Chuuk), Democratic Republic of the Congo, Niue, and Saint Vincent and the Grenadines.
