= Tephrosia hispidula =

Scientific classification
- Kingdom: Plantae
- Clade: Tracheophytes
- Clade: Angiosperms
- Clade: Eudicots
- Clade: Rosids
- Order: Fabales
- Family: Fabaceae
- Subfamily: Faboideae
- Genus: Tephrosia
- Species: T. hispidula

Binomial name
- Tephrosia hispidula (Michx.) Pers

Species of perennial legume

Tephrosia hispidula, also known as sprawling hoarypea, is a species of perennial legume native to North America.

== Description ==
The stems of T. hispidula range from decumbent to erect in stature, reaching a length of up to 50 cm (20 in). The leaves are narrowly elliptic to elliptic-lanceolate in shape, with bicolored blades ranging in length from 9 to 20 cm (3.5 to 7.9 in). They are glabrous to densely pubescent on the top and sparsely to densely pubescent on the underside.

Inflorescence occurs opposite the leaves, ranging from 5 to 15 cm (2.0 to 5.9 in) in length, with a flattened peduncle or terete and narrowly lanceolate to linear bracts. The corolla starts as white to yellow in coloration, transitioning over time to reddish.

When legumes are produced they are 3 to 4.2 cm (1.2 to 1.7 in) in length and sparsely to moderately pubescent, with trichomes at least 0.6 mm (0.024 in) in length.

== Distribution and habitat ==
Tephrosia hispidula is endemic to the southeastern region of the United States, its range stretching from Virginia south to Florida and westward to Louisiana. It may be found in environments such as pine savannas, sandhills, hardwood swamps, wiregrass woodlands, and alongside rivers.
