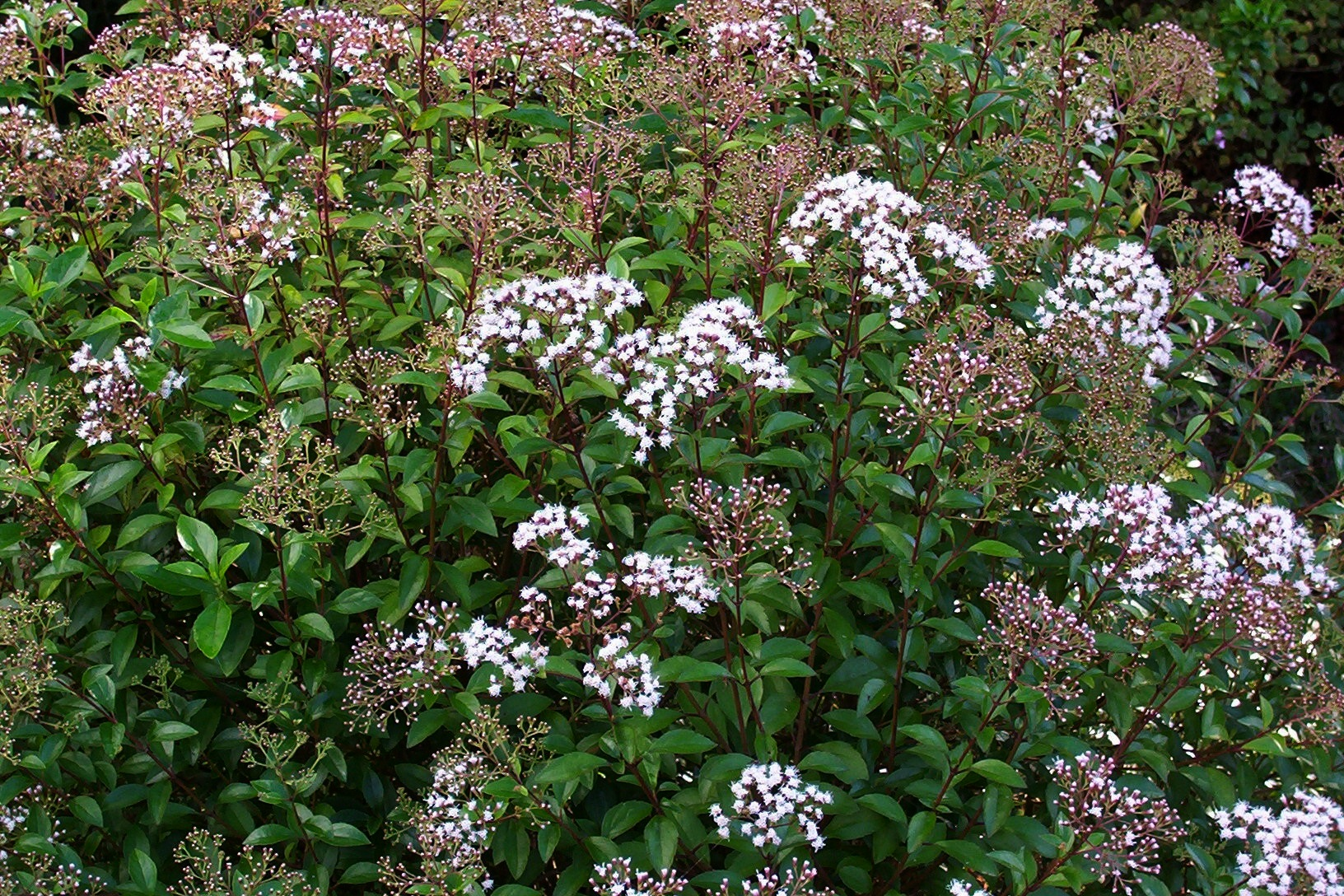

Scientific classification
- Kingdom: Plantae
- Clade: Tracheophytes
- Clade: Angiosperms
- Clade: Eudicots
- Clade: Asterids
- Order: Asterales
- Family: Asteraceae
- Genus: Ageratina
- Species: A. ligustrina

Binomial name
- Ageratina ligustrina (DC.) R.M.King & H.Rob.

Synonyms
- Synonymy: Eupatorium biceps Klotzsch ex Vatke; Eupatorium erythropappum B.L.Rob.; Eupatorium ligustaefolium DC.; Eupatorium ligustifolium DC.; Eupatorium ligustrinum DC.; Eupatorium micranthum Less. 1830 not Lag. 1816; Eupatorium myriadenium Schauer; Eupatorium semialatum Benth.; Eupatorium weinmannianum Regel & Körn.

= Ageratina ligustrina =

Species of flowering plant

Ageratina ligustrina, the privet-leaved ageratina or privet-leaved snakeroot, is Mesoamerican species of evergreen flowering shrub in the sunflower family. It is widespread across much of Mexico and Central America from Tamaulipas to Costa Rica.

Ageratina ligustrina grows to 4 metres tall, producing flat heads of daisy-like white to pink composite flower-heads in autumn. The fragrant flower-heads may be up to 20 centimeters in diameter and attract butterflies. The leaves are light green, elliptic to lance shaped, with toothed margins.

== Cultivation ==
Ageratina ligustrina has been in cultivation since the mid 1800s, and in 1996, it gained the Royal Horticultural Society's Award of Garden Merit. It is not fully hardy in temperate regions. In the US, it is suitable to be grown outdoors in hardiness zones 9–11. A. ligustrina tends to be susceptible to slugs and aphids if grown outside, and whiteflies and red spider mites if grown in a greenhouse.

== Etymology ==
Ageratina is derived from Greek meaning 'un-aging', in reference to the flowers keeping their color for a long time. This name was used by Dioscorides for a number of different plants.

The Latin specific epithet ligustrina highlights the plant's resemblance to the privet Ligustrum, though the two plants are not believed to be closely related.

== Chemical compounds ==
Eupalin and eupatolin are flavonol rhamnosides isolated from E. ligustrinum.
