= Tephrosia odorata =

Conservation status
- Least Concern (IUCN 3.1)

Scientific classification
- Kingdom: Plantae
- Clade: Tracheophytes
- Clade: Angiosperms
- Clade: Eudicots
- Clade: Rosids
- Order: Fabales
- Family: Fabaceae
- Subfamily: Faboideae
- Genus: Tephrosia
- Species: T. odorata

Binomial name
- Tephrosia odorata Balf.f.

Species of plant

Tephrosia odorata is a species of plant in the family Fabaceae. It is endemic to Socotra in Yemen. Its natural habitat is subtropical or tropical dry lowland grassland.
