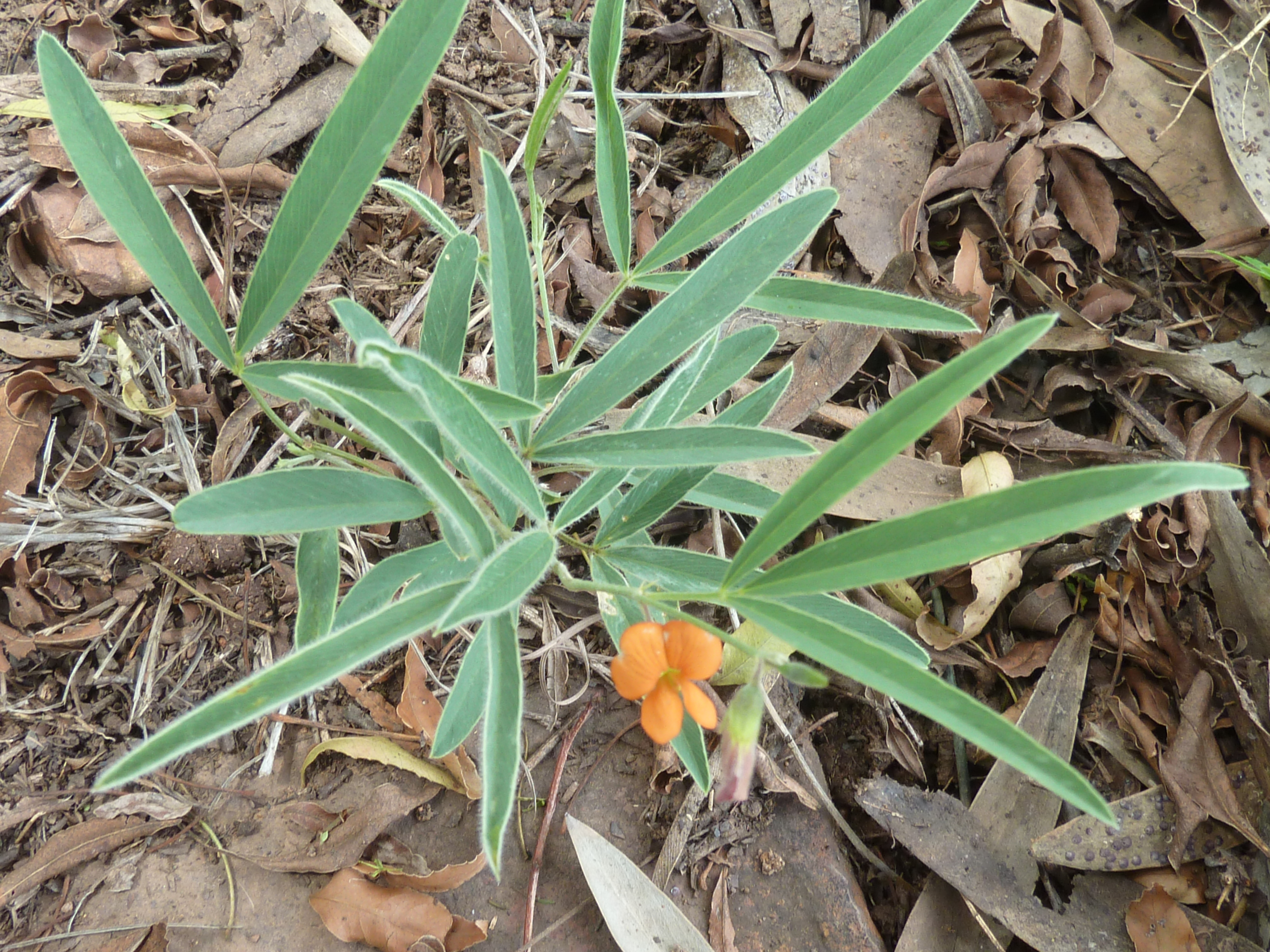
- Tephrosia elongata var. elongata

Scientific classification
- Kingdom: Plantae
- Clade: Embryophytes
- Clade: Tracheophytes
- Clade: Spermatophytes
- Clade: Angiosperms
- Clade: Eudicots
- Clade: Rosids
- Order: Fabales
- Family: Fabaceae
- Subfamily: Faboideae
- Genus: Tephrosia
- Species: T. elongata

Binomial name
- Tephrosia elongata E.Mey.

Synonyms
- Cracca elongata (E.Mey.) Kuntze

= Tephrosia elongata =

Species of legume

Tephrosia elongata is a species of flowering plant in the family Fabaceae. It is native to Africa south of the equator. It occurs from northern and eastern South Africa to the highlands of Malawi and Tanzania.

== Varieties ==
Three varieties are recognized:

- Tephrosia elongata E.Mey. var. elongata
- Tephrosia elongata var. lasiocaulos Brummitt
- Tephrosia elongata var. tzaneenensis (H.M.L.Forbes) Brummitt
