= Tephrosia clementii =

Scientific classification
- Kingdom: Plantae
- Clade: Tracheophytes
- Clade: Angiosperms
- Clade: Eudicots
- Clade: Rosids
- Order: Fabales
- Family: Fabaceae
- Subfamily: Faboideae
- Genus: Tephrosia
- Species: T. clementii

Binomial name
- Tephrosia clementii Skan

Species of legume

Tephrosia clementii is a plant species, endemic to the north-west of Western Australia. It is an annual with a prostrate, spreading habit, growing to between 0.1 and 0.25 metres high. Orange or red flowers are produced between January and March in the species' native range.

The species was first formally described by S.A.Skan in 1903 in Icones Plantarum, from a collection by Emile Clement between the Ashburton and Yule Rivers.
