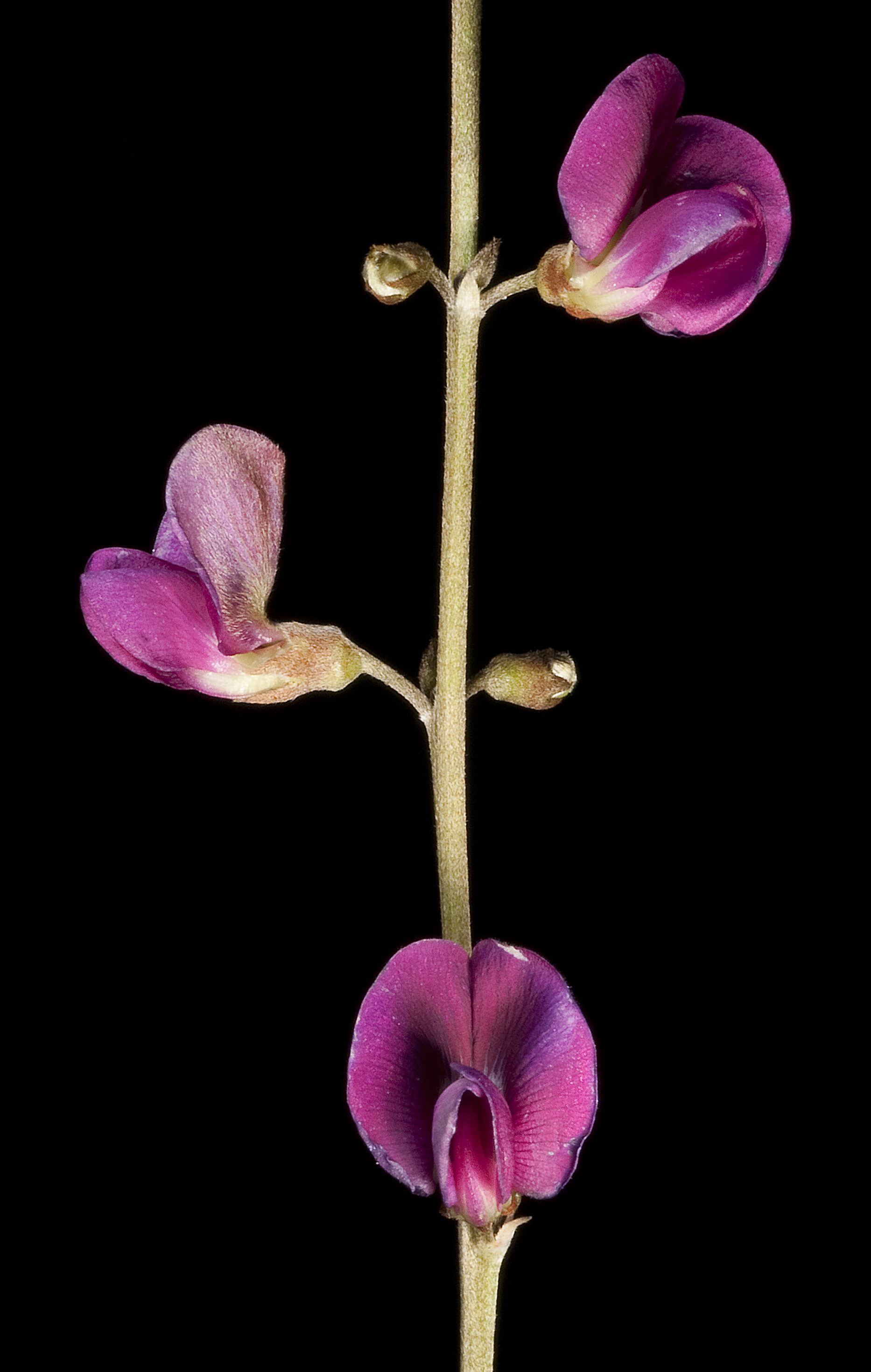

Scientific classification
- Kingdom: Plantae
- Clade: Tracheophytes
- Clade: Angiosperms
- Clade: Eudicots
- Clade: Rosids
- Order: Fabales
- Family: Fabaceae
- Subfamily: Faboideae
- Genus: Tephrosia
- Species: T. rosea

Binomial name
- Tephrosia rosea F.Muell. ex Benth.

= Tephrosia rosea =

Species of legume

Tephrosia rosea, commonly known as Flinders River poison, is a plant species, endemic to northern Australia. It is a shrub with an erect or sprawling habit, growing to between 0.2 and 2 metres high. Pink to purple flowers are produced throughout the year in the species' native range.

The species was first formally described by Victorian Government Botanist Ferdinand von Mueller in 1864 in Flora Australiensis, from a collection at Montague Sound.

Varieties include:

- Tephrosia rosea var. clementii Domin
- Tephrosia rosea var. glabrior Pedley ms
- Tephrosia rosea Benth. var. rosea
- Tephrosia rosea var. venulosa Pedley ms
