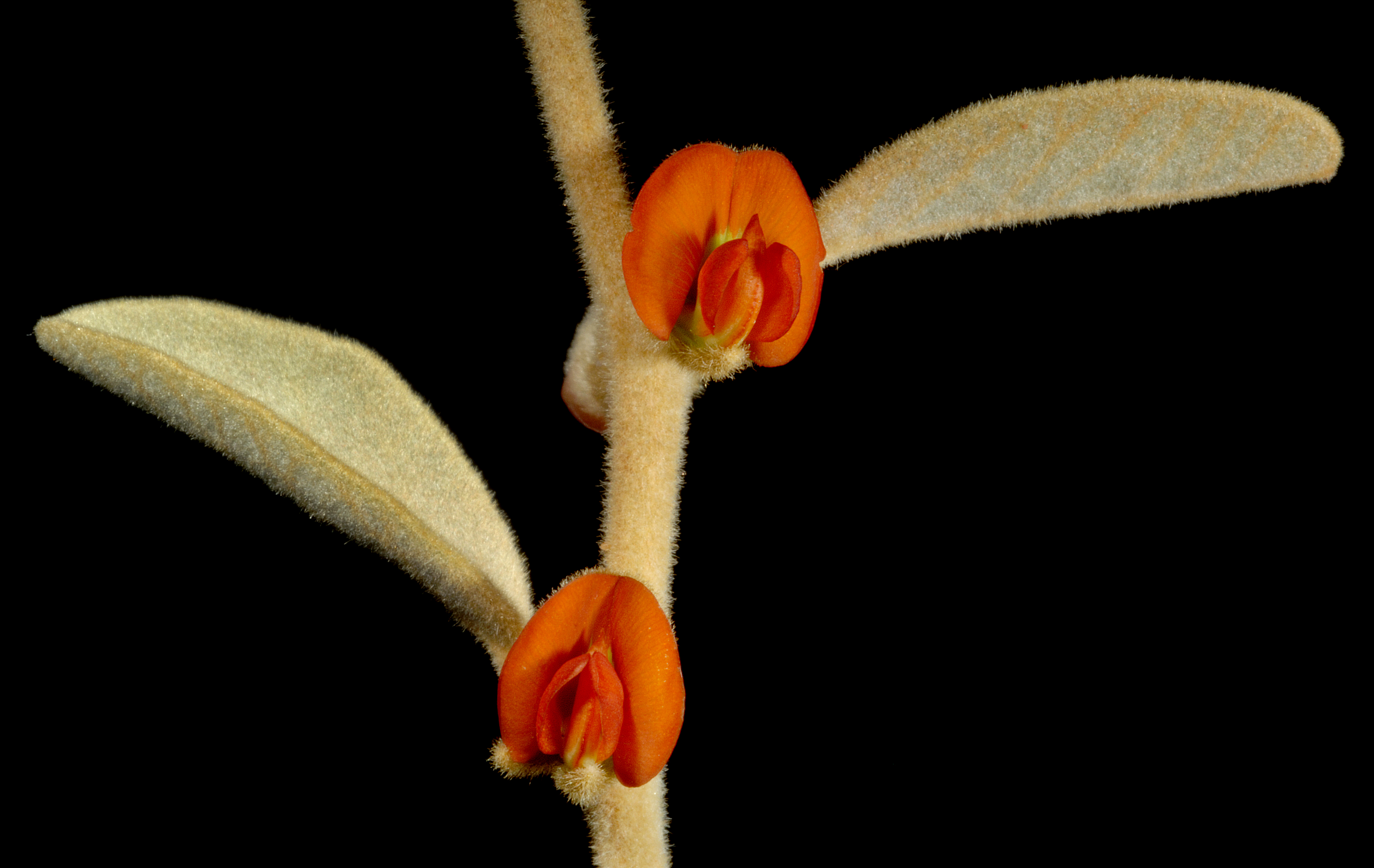

Scientific classification
- Kingdom: Plantae
- Clade: Tracheophytes
- Clade: Angiosperms
- Clade: Eudicots
- Clade: Rosids
- Order: Fabales
- Family: Fabaceae
- Subfamily: Faboideae
- Genus: Tephrosia
- Species: T. arenicola

Binomial name
- Tephrosia arenicola Maconochie

= Tephrosia arenicola =

Species of plant

Tephrosia arenicola is a plant in the Fabaceae family, native to the north of Western Australia. The species has no synonyms.

== Description ==
Tephrosia arenicola is shrub covered with dense intertwined hairs (tomentose). The shrub consists of several stems which arise from the base growing to about 50 cm high. The leaves are unifoliolate (compound leaves reduced to single leaflet - and recognizable by the jointed ‘petiole’). Their shape is elliptical to ovate, and the edges are entire. They have a dense covering of curved intertwined hairs, are about 0.3-0.5 mm long), and have 6 to 8 lateral veins below. The stipules are inconspicuous or absent. The flowers are axillary, solitary, stalkless and about 5-6 mm long. The calyx, too, is densely tomentose, with lobes which are narrow and which gradually taper to a fine apex, and are about 4 mm long. The standard is orbicular (5x6 mm) and densely covered with short weak hairs on the back. It is orange and has a yellow "eye" at its base. The wings are orange, and 4 x 1.5 mm. The keel is a dark orange (4 x 1.5 mm). The stamens are 9+1, and the style is flattened with a brush-like beard along the adaxial side. The stigma has a bearded tip. The ovary is densely covered with short, weak, soft hairs.

It flowers from April to May.

== Distribution and habitat ==
It is found in the IBRA regions of the Central Kimberley, the Gascoyne, the Gibson Desert, the Great Sandy Desert, the Little Sandy Desert, and the Pilbara, growing on sandplains, sand ridges, and drainage lines, on red sand, sandy gravel, and alluvium.

== Conservation status ==
It has been declared as "not threatened" under the state conservation act.
