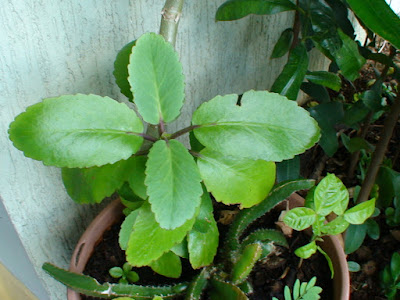

Scientific classification
- Kingdom: Plantae
- Clade: Tracheophytes
- Clade: Angiosperms
- Clade: Eudicots
- Order: Saxifragales
- Family: Crassulaceae
- Genus: Kalanchoe
- Species: K. brasiliensis

Binomial name
- Kalanchoe brasiliensis Camb.

= Kalanchoe brasiliensis =

Species of succulent

Kalanchoe brasiliensis, the saião, folha-da-costa or coerama, is a plant species in the genus Kalanchoe. According to POWO, it is a synonym of Kalanchoe crenata.

Patuletin acetylrhamnosides can be isolated from K. brasiliensis.
