= Tephrosia spinosa =

Scientific classification
- Kingdom: Plantae
- Clade: Tracheophytes
- Clade: Angiosperms
- Clade: Eudicots
- Clade: Rosids
- Order: Fabales
- Family: Fabaceae
- Subfamily: Faboideae
- Genus: Tephrosia
- Species: T. spinosa

Binomial name
- Tephrosia spinosa (L. f.) Pers. 1807

Species of legume

Tephrosia spinosa is a flowering plant species in the genus Tephrosia native from India, Sri Lanka, Malaysia and Indonesia.

Eupalitin 3-O-β-D-galactopyranoside, a glycoside of the flavonol eupalitin, can be isolated from T. spinosa. Tephrospinosin (3′,5′-diisopentenyl-2′,4′-dihydroxychalcone), a prenylated chalcone, can be isolated from the root.
