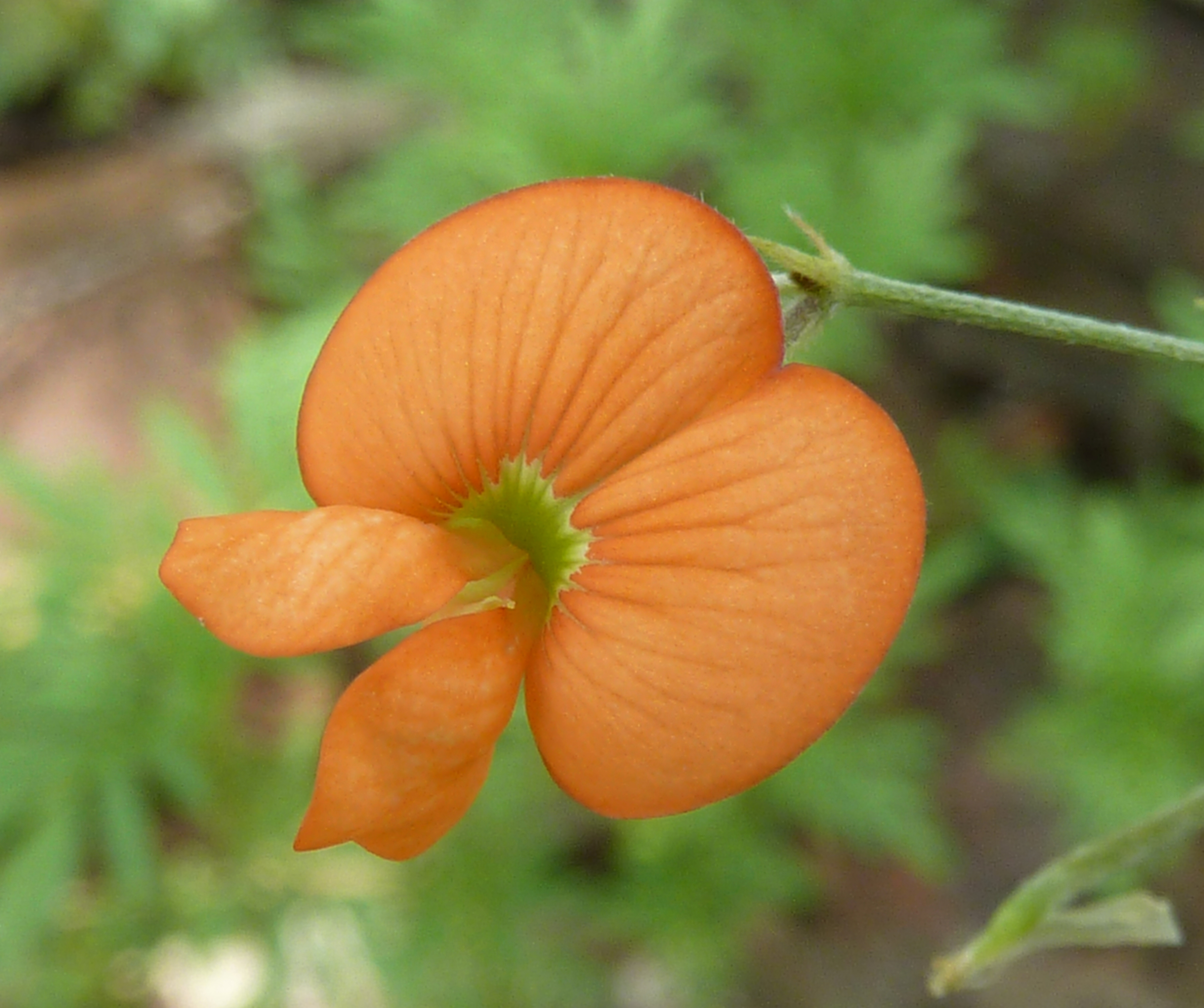
- Tephrosia elongata

Scientific classification
- Kingdom: Plantae
- Clade: Tracheophytes
- Clade: Angiosperms
- Clade: Eudicots
- Clade: Rosids
- Order: Fabales
- Family: Fabaceae
- Subfamily: Faboideae
- Tribe: Millettieae
- Genus: Tephrosia; Pers. 1807

Species
- See text.

Synonyms
- List: Apodynomene E.Mey. (1836); Catacline Edgew. (1847), nom. provis.; Caulocarpus Baker f. (1926); Colinil Adans. (1763); Cracca L. (1753) (non Benth.), nom. rej.; Crafordia Raf. (1814); Erebinthus Mitch. (1748); Kiesera Reinw. ex Blume (1823); Lupinophyllum Hutch. (1967); Macronyx Dalzell (1850); Needhamia Scop. (1777); Orobos St.-Lag. (1880); Paratephrosia Domin (1912); Pogonostigma Boiss. (1843); Reineria Moench (1802); Seemannantha Alef. (1862); Xiphocarpus C.Presl (1831)

= Tephrosia =

Genus of plants

Tephrosia is a genus of flowering plants in the family Fabaceae. It is widespread in both the Eastern and Western Hemisphere, where it is found in tropical and warm-temperate regions.

The generic name is derived from the Greek word τεφρος (tephros), meaning "ash-colored," referring to the greyish tint given to the leaves by their dense trichomes. Hoarypea is a common name for plants in this genus, along with goat's rue and devil's shoestring.

== Uses ==
Many species in the genus are poisonous, particularly to fish, for their high concentration of rotenone. The black seeds of Tephrosia species have historically been used by indigenous cultures as fish toxins. In the last century, several Tephrosia species have been studied in connection with the use of rotenone as an insecticide and pesticide.

Tephrosia vogelii is also one of the many beneficial nitrogen-fixing legumes that can be used in a permaculture forest gardening system as a source of living 'chop and drop' mulch.

== Selected species ==
Species include:

- Tephrosia arenicola Maconochie
- Tephrosia candida (Roxb.) DC.
- Tephrosia chrysophylla Pursh
- Tephrosia clementii Skan
- Tephrosia elongata E.Mey.
- Tephrosia glomeruliflora Meissner
- Tephrosia mysteriosa DeLaney
- Tephrosia odorata Balf.f.
- Tephrosia onobrychoides Nutt.
- Tephrosia pondoensis (Codd) Schrire
- Tephrosia purpurea (L.) Pers.
- Tephrosia socotrana Thulin
- Tephrosia spinosa (L.f.) Pers.
- Tephrosia virginiana (L.) Pers.
- Tephrosia vogelii Hook.f.

== See also ==
- Helena M. L. Forbes
