= List of Lonchocarpus species =

List of known Lonchocarpus species

This is a list of known Lonchocarpus Kunth species (lancepods), organized in alphabetical order. As of September 2023, a total of 166 species were accepted in Plants of the World Online:

- Lonchocarpus acuminatus (Schltdl.) M.Sousa
- Lonchocarpus adamsii M.Sousa
- Lonchocarpus aequatorialis M.Sousa
- Lonchocarpus alternifoliolatus M.Sousa
- Lonchocarpus andrieuxii M.Sousa
- Lonchocarpus angusticarpus M.Sousa
- Lonchocarpus antioquiensis M.Sousa
- Lonchocarpus argyrotrichus Harms
- Lonchocarpus atropurpureus Benth.
- Lonchocarpus balsensis M.Sousa & J.C.Soto
- Lonchocarpus barbatus M.Sousa, E.Martínez & Ramos
- Lonchocarpus benthamianus Pittier
- Lonchocarpus berriozabalensis Miranda ex M.Sousa
- Lonchocarpus bicolor M.Sousa
- Lonchocarpus blainii C.Wright
- Lonchocarpus brachyanthus M.Sousa
- Lonchocarpus bracteolatus M.Sousa
- Lonchocarpus brenesii M.Sousa
- Lonchocarpus canoensis M.Sousa
- Lonchocarpus capassa Rolfe
- Lonchocarpus capensis M.E.Jones
- Lonchocarpus castilloi Standl.
- Lonchocarpus caudatus Pittier
- Lonchocarpus chavelasii M.Sousa ex Cruz Durán & G.Andrade
- Lonchocarpus chiangii M.Sousa
- Lonchocarpus chiricanus Pittier
- Lonchocarpus cochleatus Pittier
- Lonchocarpus comitensis Pittier
- Lonchocarpus congestiflorus M.Sousa & J.Linares
- Lonchocarpus constrictus Pittier
- Lonchocarpus costaricensis (Donn.Sm.) Pittier
- Lonchocarpus crassicalyx M.Sousa
- Lonchocarpus crassispermus Poppend.
- Lonchocarpus cristatus M.Sousa
- Lonchocarpus cruentus Lundell
- Lonchocarpus cultratus (Vell.) A.M.G.Azevedo & H.C.Lima
- Lonchocarpus ellipticus Alain
- Lonchocarpus emarginatus Pittier
- Lonchocarpus epigaeus M.Sousa
- Lonchocarpus eriocarinalis Micheli
- Lonchocarpus eriophyllus Benth.
- Lonchocarpus felipei N.Zamora
- Lonchocarpus ferrugineus M.Sousa
- Lonchocarpus foveolatus M.Sousa
- Lonchocarpus fuscopurpureus Brandegee
- Lonchocarpus galeottianus Harms
- Lonchocarpus glaucifolius Urb.
- Lonchocarpus grandifoliolatus M.Sousa
- Lonchocarpus guatemalensis Benth.
- Lonchocarpus guerrerensis M.Sousa ex Cruz Durán & G.Andrade
- Lonchocarpus guianensis M.Sousa
- Lonchocarpus gyroides M.Sousa & Cruz Durán
- Lonchocarpus haberi M.Sousa
- Lonchocarpus hedyosmus Miq.
- Lonchocarpus heptaphyllus (Poir.) DC.
- Lonchocarpus hermannii M.Sousa
- Lonchocarpus hidalgensis Lundell
- Lonchocarpus hintonii Sandwith
- Lonchocarpus hondurensis Benth.
- Lonchocarpus huetamoensis M.Sousa & J.C.Soto
- Lonchocarpus hughesii M.Sousa
- Lonchocarpus hydrophilus M.Sousa & J.Morales
- Lonchocarpus imatacensis Poppend.
- Lonchocarpus isthmensis M.Sousa
- Lonchocarpus jaliscensis Pittier
- Lonchocarpus kerberi Harms
- Lonchocarpus lanceolatus Benth.
- Lonchocarpus larensis Pittier
- Lonchocarpus lasiotropis F.J.Herm.
- Lonchocarpus latimarginatus M.Sousa
- Lonchocarpus latisiliquus M.Sousa
- Lonchocarpus lilloi (Hassl.) Burkart
- Lonchocarpus linaresii M.Sousa
- Lonchocarpus lineatus Pittier
- Lonchocarpus lomentaceus M.Sousa
- Lonchocarpus longipedunculatus M.Sousa & J.C.Soto
- Lonchocarpus longipes Urb. & Ekman
- Lonchocarpus longistylus Pittier
- Lonchocarpus luteomaculatus Pittier
- Lonchocarpus macrocarpus Benth.
- Lonchocarpus macrophyllus Kunth
- Lonchocarpus madagascariensis (Vatke) Dunn ex Polhill
- Lonchocarpus magallanesii M.Sousa
- Lonchocarpus major M.Sousa
- Lonchocarpus malacotrichus Harms
- Lonchocarpus martinezii M.Sousa
- Lonchocarpus megacarpus M.Sousa
- Lonchocarpus michelianus Pittier
- Lonchocarpus michoacanicus M.Sousa
- Lonchocarpus minimiflorus Donn.Sm.
- Lonchocarpus minor M.Sousa
- Lonchocarpus molinae Standl. & L.O.Williams
- Lonchocarpus monofoliaris Schery
- Lonchocarpus monophyllus Urb.
- Lonchocarpus monteviridis M.Sousa
- Lonchocarpus monticola M.Sousa
- Lonchocarpus morenoi M.Sousa
- Lonchocarpus multifoliolatus M.Sousa
- Lonchocarpus mutans M.Sousa
- Lonchocarpus nebularis M.Sousa
- Lonchocarpus necaxensis Miranda & M.Sousa ex Cruz Durán & G.Andrade
- Lonchocarpus neei M.Sousa
- Lonchocarpus neurophyllus Urb.
- Lonchocarpus nicoyensis (Donn.Sm.) Pittier
- Lonchocarpus nitidus (Vogel) Benth.
- Lonchocarpus oaxacensis Pittier
- Lonchocarpus obovatus Benth.
- Lonchocarpus oliganthus F.J.Herm.
- Lonchocarpus orizabensis Lundell
- Lonchocarpus palmeri Rose
- Lonchocarpus parviflorus Benth.
- Lonchocarpus patens Urb.
- Lonchocarpus paucinervius M.Sousa
- Lonchocarpus pedunculatus M.Sousa
- Lonchocarpus phaseolifolius Benth.
- Lonchocarpus phlebophyllus Standl. & Steyerm.
- Lonchocarpus pictus Pittier
- Lonchocarpus pilosus M.Sousa
- Lonchocarpus pittieri M.Sousa
- Lonchocarpus plicatus M.Sousa
- Lonchocarpus pluvialis Rusby
- Lonchocarpus praecox Mart. ex Benth.
- Lonchocarpus pubescens (Willd.) DC.
- Lonchocarpus punctatus Kunth
- Lonchocarpus pycnophyllus Urb.
- Lonchocarpus retifer Standl. & L.O.Williams
- Lonchocarpus riparius M.Sousa
- Lonchocarpus robustus Pittier
- Lonchocarpus rubiginosus Benth.
- Lonchocarpus rugosus Benth.
- Lonchocarpus salvadorensis Pittier
- Lonchocarpus sanctuarii Standl. & L.O.Williams
- Lonchocarpus santarosanus Donn.Sm.
- Lonchocarpus savannicola M.Sousa
- Lonchocarpus schiedeanus (Schltdl.) Harms
- Lonchocarpus schubertiae M.Sousa
- Lonchocarpus scorpioides M.Sousa ex Cruz Durán & G.Andrade
- Lonchocarpus semideserti M.Sousa
- Lonchocarpus seorsus (J.F.Macbr.) M.Sousa ex D.A.Neill, Klitg. & G.P.Lewis
- Lonchocarpus septentrionalis M.Sousa
- Lonchocarpus sericeus (Poir.) Kunth ex DC.
- Lonchocarpus sericocarpus M.Sousa
- Lonchocarpus sericophyllus M.Sousa
- Lonchocarpus sinaloensis (Gentry) F.J.Herm.
- Lonchocarpus spectabilis F.J.Herm.
- Lonchocarpus spiciflorus Mart. ex Benth.
- Lonchocarpus stenophyllus M.Sousa
- Lonchocarpus stenurus Pittier
- Lonchocarpus subglaucescens Mart. ex Benth.
- Lonchocarpus subsessilifolius M.Sousa
- Lonchocarpus sumiderensis M.Sousa
- Lonchocarpus sylvicola M.Sousa
- Lonchocarpus tenorioi M.Sousa
- Lonchocarpus torrensis N.F.Mattos
- Lonchocarpus trifolius Standl. & L.O.Williams
- Lonchocarpus trinitensis M.Sousa
- Lonchocarpus tuxtepecensis M.Sousa
- Lonchocarpus vallicola (Standl. & F.J.Herm.) M.Sousa
- Lonchocarpus velizii M.Sousa
- Lonchocarpus velutinus Benth.
- Lonchocarpus verrucosus M.Sousa
- Lonchocarpus violaceus (Jacq.) Kunth ex DC.
- Lonchocarpus vittatus M.Sousa
- Lonchocarpus wendtii M.Sousa
- Lonchocarpus xuul Lundell
- Lonchocarpus yoroensis Standl.
- Lonchocarpus yucatanensis Pittier
