= Indigofera tinctoria =

Scientific classification
- Kingdom: Plantae
- Clade: Embryophytes
- Clade: Tracheophytes
- Clade: Spermatophytes
- Clade: Angiosperms
- Clade: Eudicots
- Clade: Rosids
- Order: Fabales
- Family: Fabaceae
- Subfamily: Faboideae
- Genus: Indigofera
- Species: I. tinctoria

Binomial name
- Indigofera tinctoria L.

Synonyms
- Anila tinctoria var. normalis Kuntze; Indigofera anil var. orthocarpa DC.; Indigofera bergii Vatke; Indigofera cinerascens DC.; Indigofera houer Forssk.; Indigofera indica Lam.; Indigofera oligophylla Baker; Indigofera orthocarpa (DC.) O.Berg & C.F.Schmidt; Indigofera sumatrana Gaertn.; Indigofera tinctoria Blanco; Indigofera tulearensis Drake

Species of legume

Indigofera tinctoria, also called true indigo, is a species of plant from the bean family that was one of the original sources of indigo dye.

== Description ==
True indigo is a shrub 1–2 metres (3 ft 3 in – 6 ft 7 in) high. It may be an annual, biennial, or perennial, depending on the climate in which it is grown. It has light green pinnate leaves and sheafs of pink or violet flowers.

The rotenoids deguelin, dehydrodeguelin, rotenol, rotenone, tephrosin and sumatrol can be found in I. tinctoria.

=== Distribution and habitat ===
The native range of this species is tropical West Africa, Tanzania to South Africa and the Indian subcontinent to Mainland Southeast Asia.

=== Agricultural use ===
The plant is a legume, so it is rotated into fields to improve the soil in the same way that other legume crops such as alfalfa and beans are. The plant is also widely grown as a soil-improving groundcover.

== Dye ==
Dye is obtained from the processing of the plant's leaves. They are soaked in water and fermented in order to convert the glycoside indican naturally present in the plant to the blue dye indigotin. The precipitate from the fermented leaf solution is mixed with a strong base such as lye.

Today most dye is synthetic, but natural dye from I. tinctoria is still available, marketed as natural colouring where it is known as tarum in Indonesia and nila in Malaysia. In Iran and areas of the former Soviet Union it is known as basma.

=== History ===
Marco Polo (13th century) was the first European to report on the preparation of indigo in India. Indigo was quite often used in European easel painting, beginning in the Middle Ages.

== See also ==
- Persicaria tinctoria
