= Lonchocarpus salvadorensis =

Scientific classification
- Kingdom: Plantae
- Clade: Tracheophytes
- Clade: Angiosperms
- Clade: Eudicots
- Clade: Rosids
- Order: Fabales
- Family: Fabaceae
- Subfamily: Faboideae
- Genus: Lonchocarpus
- Species: L. salvadorensis

Binomial name
- Lonchocarpus salvadorensis Pittier

Species of legume

Lonchocarpus salvadorensis, the Sangre de Chucho, is a plant species in the genus Lonchocarpus.

The rotenoids deguelin, rotenone, elliptone and α-toxicarol can be found in the seeds of L. salvadorensis.
