= Barbasco =

Barbasco is the name of several plants that contain poisonous chemical compounds that have been used for fishing by indigenous populations of the Americas:

- Lonchocarpus urucu, used by Shuar and Nukak peoples as a poison for fishing.
- Deguelia utilis, used in Brazil and Peru as a poison for fishing.
- Jacquinia barbasco, an evergreen.
- One of several inedible wild Mexican yam (Dioscorea mexicana and Dioscorea composita) from which progesterone can be synthesized.
