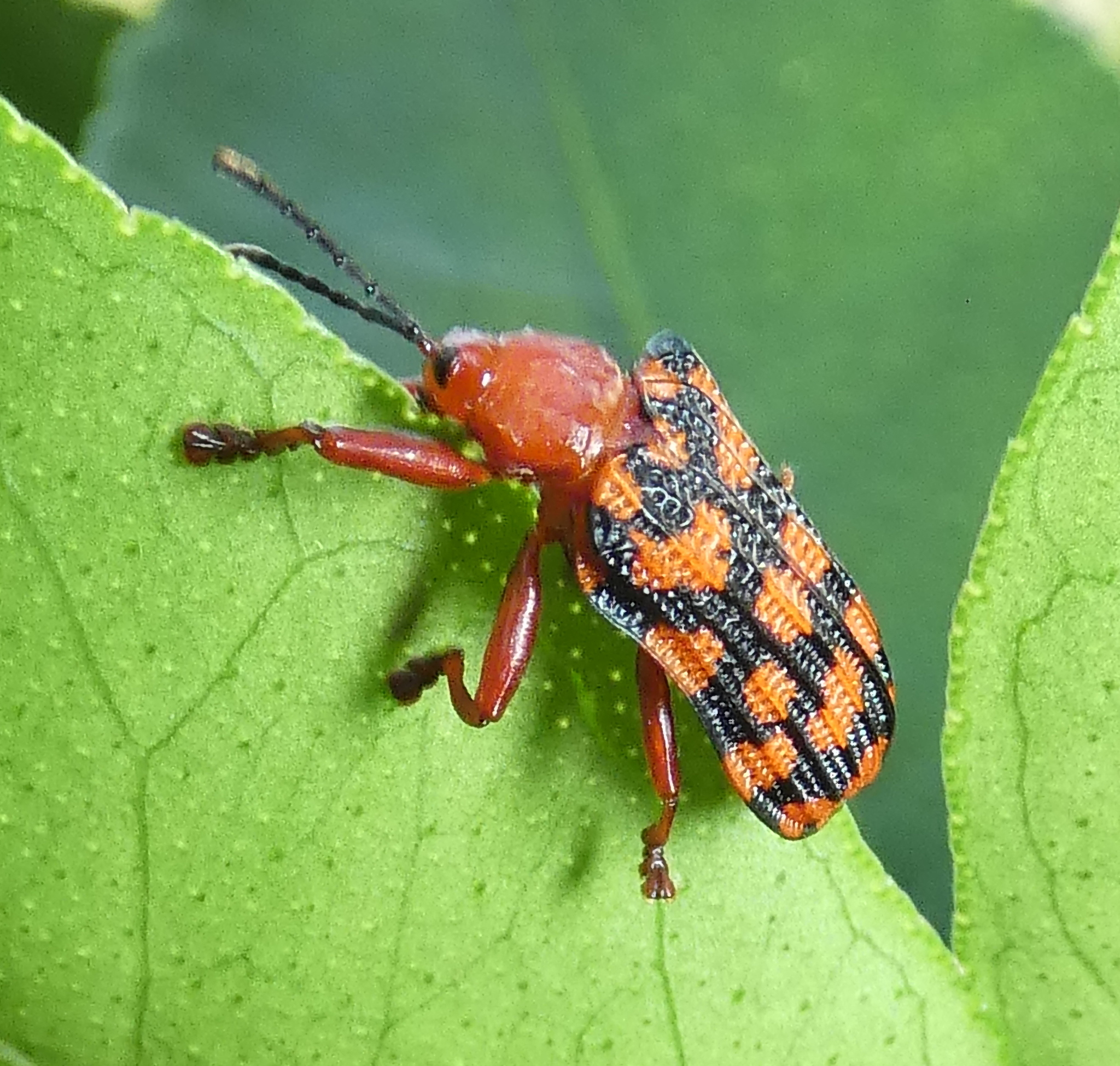

Scientific classification
- Kingdom: Animalia
- Phylum: Arthropoda
- Clade: Pancrustacea
- Class: Insecta
- Order: Coleoptera
- Suborder: Polyphaga
- Infraorder: Cucujiformia
- Family: Chrysomelidae
- Genus: Sceloenopla
- Species: S. maculata

Binomial name
- Sceloenopla maculata (Olivier, 1792)

Synonyms
- Hispa maculata Olivier, 1792; Cephalodonta angusticostata Blanchard, 1843; Hispa spinipes Fabricius, 1794

= Sceloenopla maculata =

Species of beetle

Sceloenopla maculata is a species of beetle of the family Chrysomelidae. It is found in Bolivia, Brazil (Amazonas, Bahia, Pará, Pernambuco), Ecuador, French Guiana, Peru and Suriname.

== Life history ==
The recorded host plants for this species are Cecropia lyratiloba, Lonchocarpus species, Cocos nucifera and Struthanthus marginatus.
