= Xtabentún =

Xtabentún can refer to:

- Xtabentún (flower)
- Xtabentún (liqueur)
