= Sesamothamnus leistneranus =

Conservation status
- Least Concern (IUCN 3.1)

Scientific classification
- Kingdom: Plantae
- Clade: Tracheophytes
- Clade: Angiosperms
- Clade: Eudicots
- Clade: Asterids
- Order: Lamiales
- Family: Pedaliaceae
- Genus: Sesamothamnus
- Species: S. leistneranus

Binomial name
- Sesamothamnus leistneranus Giess ex Ihlenf.

Species of flowering plant

Sesamothamnus leistneranus is a species of plant in the Pedaliaceae family. It is endemic to Namibia. Its natural habitat is subtropical or tropical dry shrubland.
