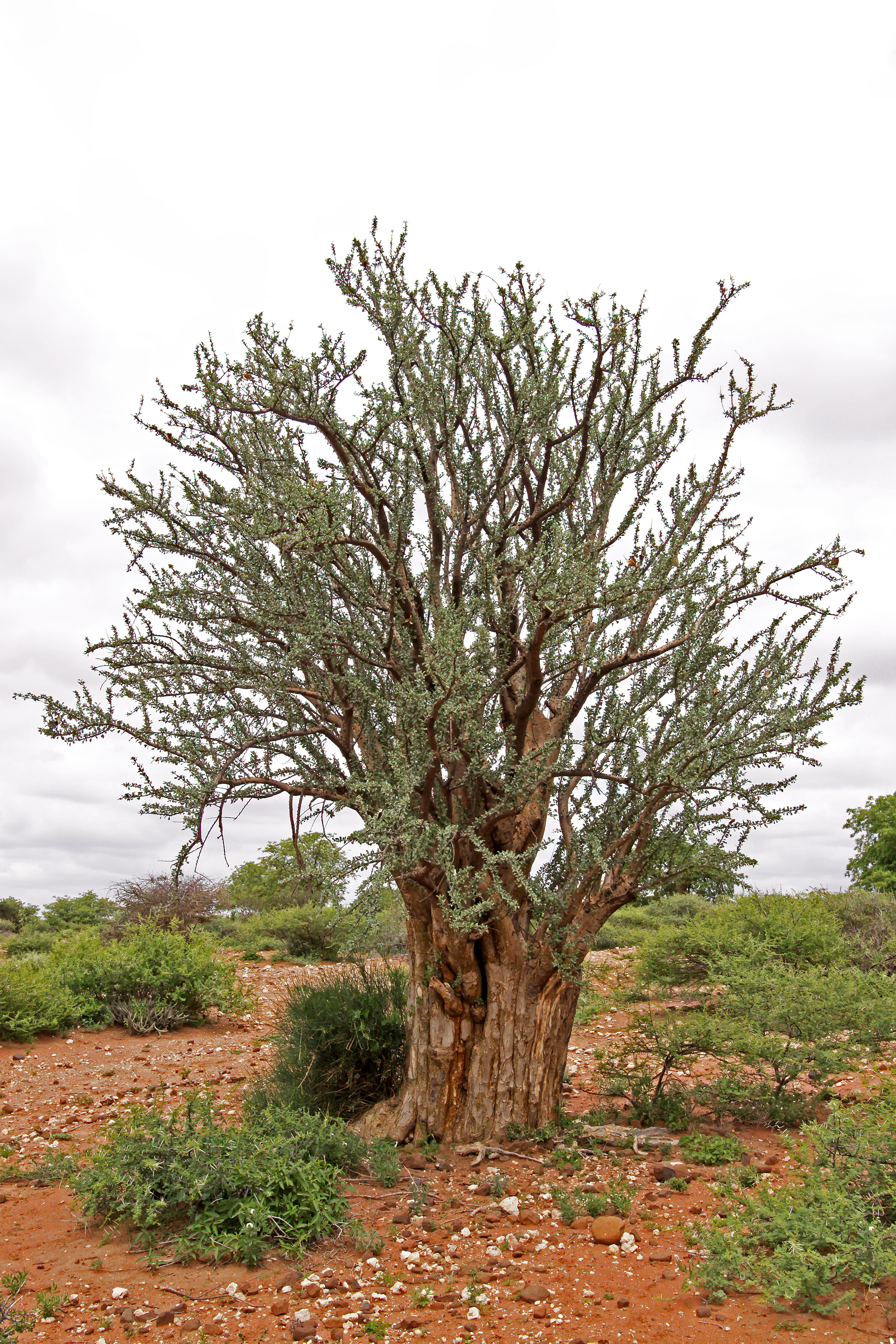

Scientific classification
- Kingdom: Plantae
- Clade: Tracheophytes
- Clade: Angiosperms
- Clade: Eudicots
- Clade: Asterids
- Order: Lamiales
- Family: Pedaliaceae
- Genus: Sesamothamnus
- Species: S. lugardii

Binomial name
- Sesamothamnus lugardii N.E.Br. ex Stapf

Synonyms
- Sesamothamnus seineri Engl. nom. nud.

= Sesamothamnus lugardii =

Species of flowering plant

Sesamothamnus lugardii, commonly known as the Transvaal sesame-bush, sesame-bush, or sesambos, is a species of plant in the family Pedaliaceae. It is a succulent, spiny shrub or small tree native to southern Africa. Local common names include tshinonzhe in the Venda language.

== Taxonomy ==
The species was first described in 1906 by N. E. Brown and Otto Stapf in the Flora of Tropical Africa. The specific epithet lugardii honors Major Edward James Lugard (1865–1957), a British-born plant collector who extensively collected plants in Botswana. A later name, Sesamothamnus seineri published by Adolf Engler in 1910, is considered a nomen nudum and a synonym of S. lugardii.

== Description ==
Sesamothamnus lugardii is a multi-stemmed, succulent, spiny shrub or small tree that grows up to 4 m (13 ft) tall. The trunk is characteristically swollen at the base, reaching up to 1 m (3.3 ft) in diameter, and tapers into thick, ascending branches reminiscent of a baobab. The bark is described as dark yellowish-green, papery in texture.

Leaves are obovate (egg-shaped with the narrower end at the base), occurring in two forms: alternate and petiolate on long shoots, or sessile and clustered (fasciculate) on short shoots. The leaves fold upward along the midrib, are green above and paler below, with both surfaces covered in short, greyish hairs.

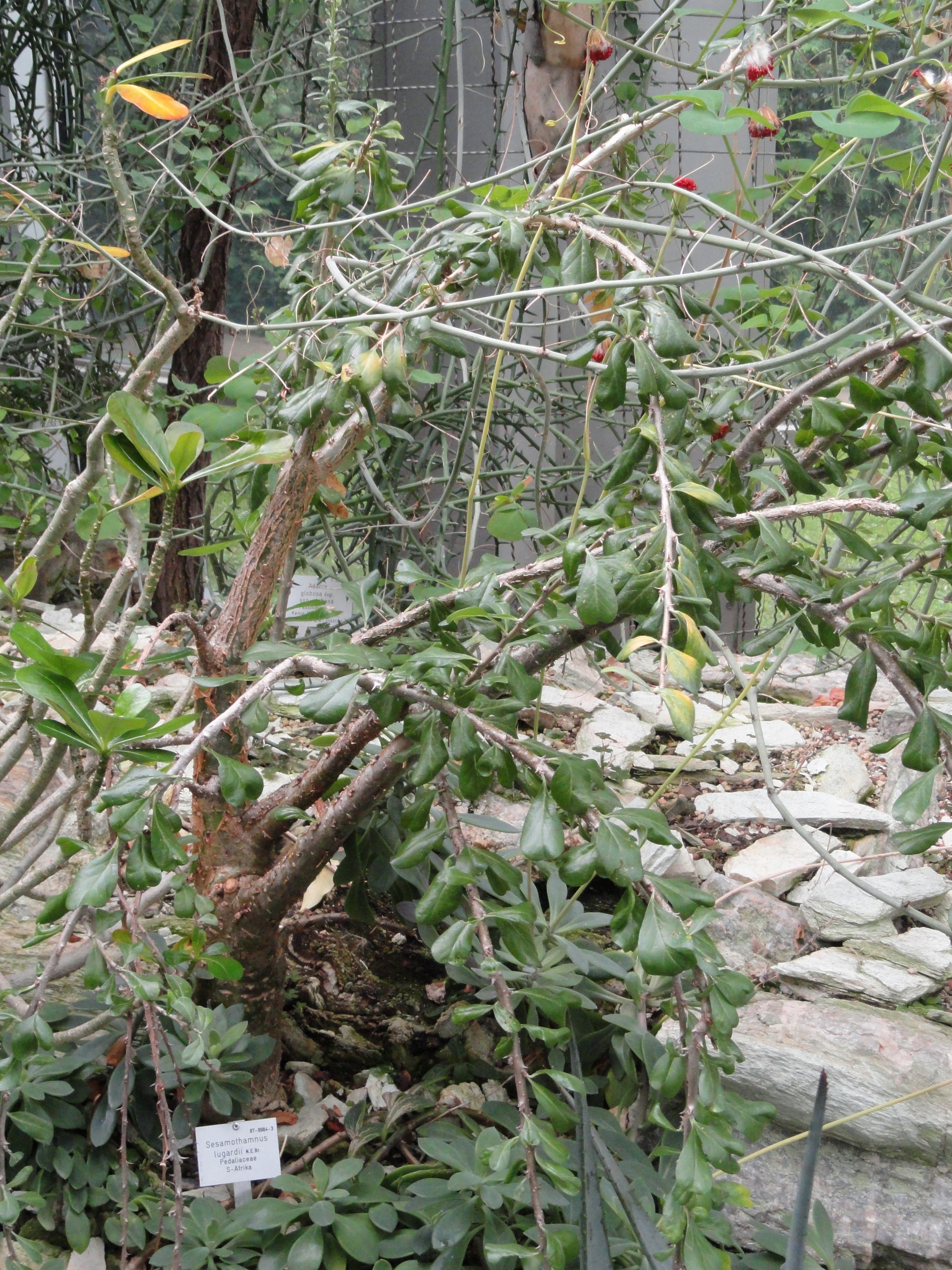
Botanical specimen in the Palmengarten.

The flowers are large and showy, solitary in the leaf axils. They are trumpet-shaped with a long, curved corolla tube measuring approximately 10 cm (3.9 in) in length, and possess a spur at the base. The flowers are white, pink, or cream-colored, often with a purplish tinge on the exterior. Flowering occurs from September to December.

The fruit is a flattened, woody capsule, notched at the base, containing winged seeds.

== Distribution and habitat ==
Sesamothamnus lugardii is native to southern Africa. Its range includes southern Zimbabwe, eastern Botswana, the Limpopo, Mpumalanga, and North West provinces of South Africa. While earlier sources sometimes included Namibia, modern taxonomic treatments limit its range to Zimbabwe, Botswana, and South Africa. It is not endemic to South Africa.

The species grows in hot, dry areas, often occurring alone or in scattered, small groups. It is found in a variety of habitats, including alluvial plains, Kalahari sand, rocky soils, and areas with hard loamy soil. Associated plant species include Commiphora, Catophractes alexandri, Acacia tortilis, Acacia senegal, Balanites, Salvadora australis, and Mundulea sericea.

== Ecology and pollination ==
The floral traits of S. lugardii suggest specialization for pollination by long-tongued hawkmoths. Flowers open in the evening, are large, sweetly scented, and pale in color, all characteristics of a moth pollination syndrome. Research has identified the convolvulus hawkmoth (Agrius convolvuli) as the primary pollinator. This species possesses a proboscis long enough to access the nectar at the base of the 10 cm (3.9 in) corolla tube while simultaneously interacting with the reproductive structures. The plant is an obligate outcrosser, meaning it relies entirely on cross-pollination by A. convolvuli for successful sexual reproduction.

Fruit set is affected by florivory (flower predation). In a study conducted at Mapungubwe National Park, predation of flowers by scarab beetles resulted in low fruit set, whereas a population at a nearby private reserve with negligible florivory showed higher fruit set.

Herbivory by meso- and mega-herbivores significantly impacts mature shrubs. However, the species demonstrates resilience through bark recovery and epicormic resprouting.

Seedlings are rarely observed in wild populations. A study comparing populations between 2005 and 2014 noted a decrease in the number of seedlings, suggesting either sporadic recruitment patterns or a demographic bottleneck limiting establishment.

== Conservation ==
The South African National Biodiversity Institute (SANBI) assesses Sesamothamnus lugardii as Least Concern in the Red List of South African Plants. This automated status was assigned as the taxon was not selected for detailed assessment in screening processes.

Despite its Least Concern status, the species exhibits traits that could increase its vulnerability to extinction. These include pollinator specialization (dependence on Agrius convolvuli) and obligate outcrossing, which make sexual reproduction dependent on a single pollinator species. Low seedling recruitment rates and slow population turnover also contribute to demographic vulnerability. However, the species offsets these risks through longevity and vigorous resprouting ability, which buffer populations during periods of reproductive failure. Researchers have noted that increasing herbivore populations in protected areas such as Mapungubwe National Park could reach a critical threshold where the species loses its resilience, potentially leading to local extirpation.
