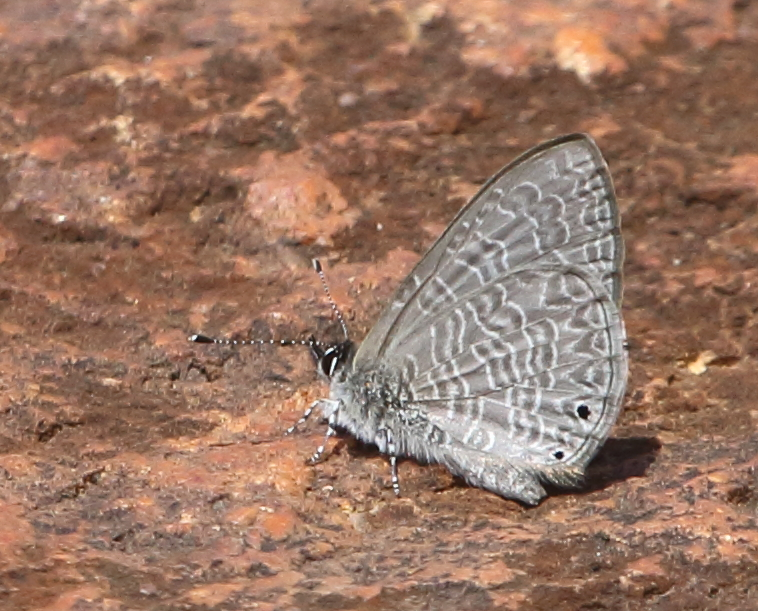
- Pseudonacaduba sichela sichela
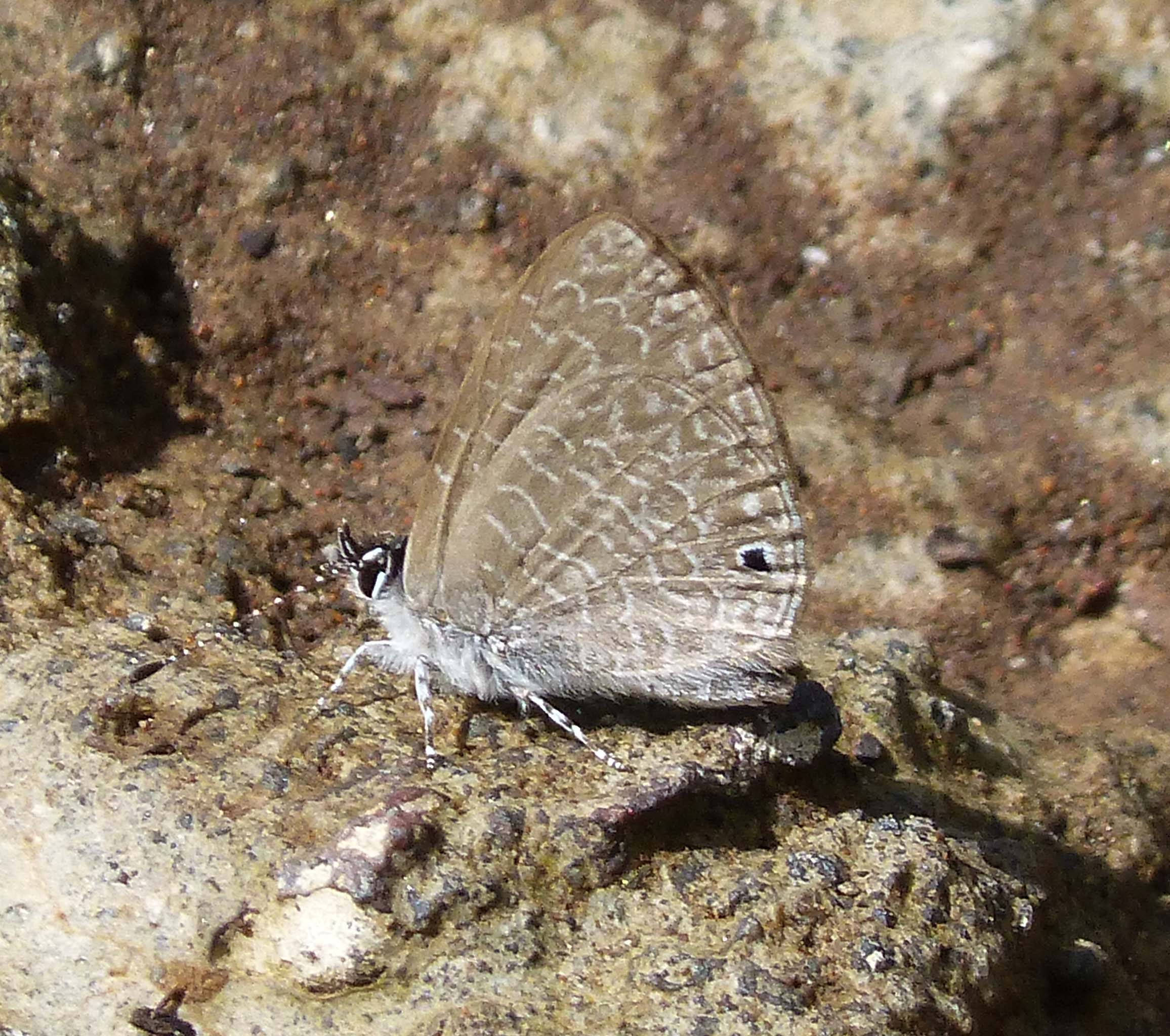
- Pseudonacaduba sichela reticulum

Scientific classification
- Kingdom: Animalia
- Phylum: Arthropoda
- Clade: Pancrustacea
- Class: Insecta
- Order: Lepidoptera
- Family: Lycaenidae
- Genus: Pseudonacaduba
- Species: P. sichela

Binomial name
- Pseudonacaduba sichela (Wallengren, 1857)

Synonyms
- Lycaena sichela Wallengren, 1857; Petrelaea sichela; Lycaena reticulum Mabille, 1877; Nacaduba dexamene Druce, 1887; Lycaenesthes docilis Butler, 1888

= Pseudonacaduba sichela =

Species of butterfly

Pseudonacaduba sichela, the African line blue, dusky line blue or dusky blue, is a butterfly of the family Lycaenidae. It is found in Africa, south of the Sahara.

The wingspan is 25–28 mm for males and 25–27 mm for females. Adults are on wing from October to May.

The larvae probably feed on Mundulea sericea.

== Subspecies ==
- Pseudonacaduba sichela sichela (Africa, south of the Sahara)
- Pseudonacaduba sichela reticulum (Mabille, 1877) (Madagascar and Mauritius)

Torben Larsen developed a species numbering system for his 2005 publication Butterflies of West Africa. The nominate subspecies is #565. The 'Larsen' numbers have since been used with permission in A Sharp Eye on Butterflies of Ghana.
