= Tephrosin =

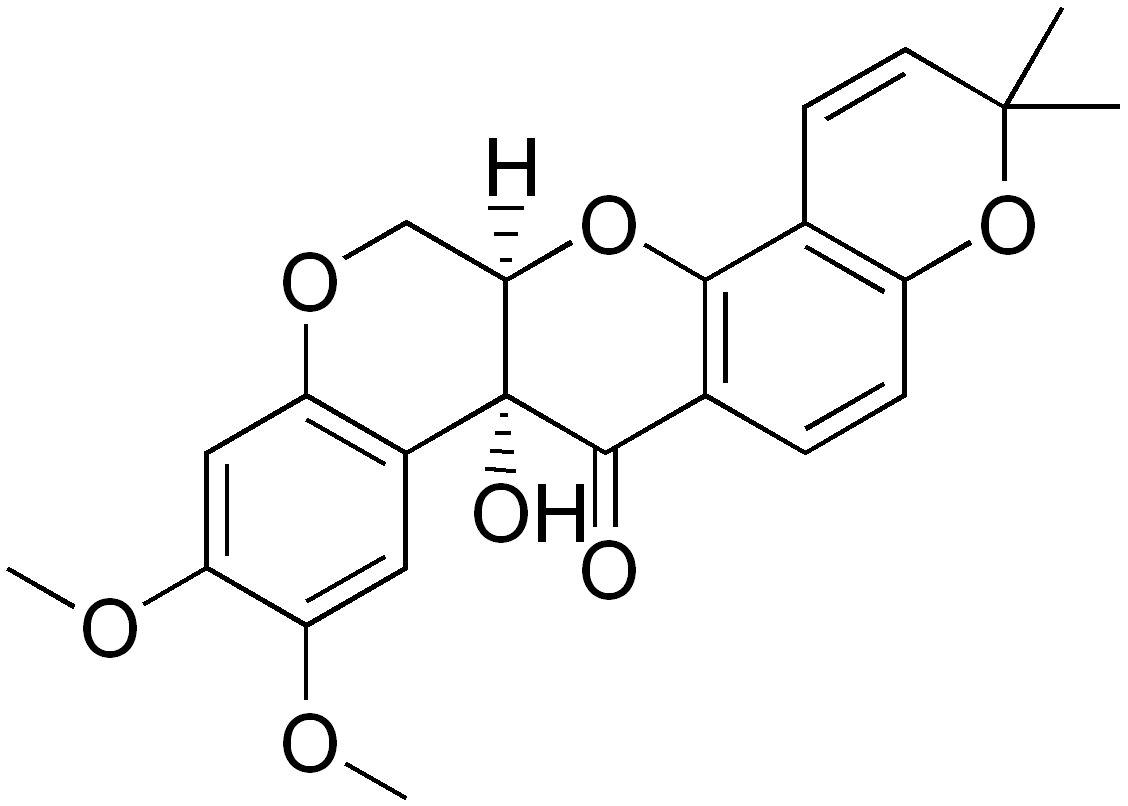

Names
- IUPAC name 7a-Hydroxy-9,10-dimethoxy-3,3-dimethyl-13,13a-dihydro-3H,7aH-pyrano[2,3-c;6,5-f']dichromen-7-one
- Other names 12aβ-hydroxydeguelin

Identifiers
CAS Number	76-80-2
3D model (JSmol)	Interactive image
ChEBI	CHEBI:9442
ChEMBL	ChEMBL241806
ChemSpider	102858
ECHA InfoCard	100.231.407
KEGG	C10535
PubChem CID	114909
UNII	9C081V83CC
CompTox Dashboard (EPA)	DTXSID20878627
- InChI: InChI=1S/C23H22O7/c1-22(2)8-7-12-15(30-22)6-5-13-20(12)29-19-11-28-16-10-18(27-4)17(26-3)9-14(16)23(19,25)21(13)24/h5-10,19,25H,11H2,1-4H3/t19-,23-/m1/s1 Key: AQBZCCQCDWNNJQ-AUSIDOKSSA-N; InChI=1/C23H22O7/c1-22(2)8-7-12-15(30-22)6-5-13-20(12)29-19-11-28-16-10-18(27-4)17(26-3)9-14(16)23(19,25)21(13)24/h5-10,19,25H,11H2,1-4H3/t19-,23-/m1/s1 Key: AQBZCCQCDWNNJQ-AUSIDOKSBD
- SMILES: CC1(C=CC2=C(O1)C=CC3=C2O[C@@H]4COC5=CC(=C(C=C5[C@@]4(C3=O)O)OC)OC)C

Properties
Chemical formula	C_{23}H_{22}O_{7}
Molar mass	410.41658 g/mol

Related compounds
Related compounds	Deguelin, toxicarol
- Except where otherwise noted, data are given for materials in their standard state (at 25 °C [77 °F], 100 kPa). verify (what is ?) Infobox references

Tephrosin is rotenoid. It is a natural fish poison found in the leaves and seeds of Tephrosia purpurea and T. vogelii.

== See also ==
- Cubé resin
