= Lonchocarpus vallicola =

Conservation status
- Endangered (IUCN 2.3)

Scientific classification
- Kingdom: Plantae
- Clade: Tracheophytes
- Clade: Angiosperms
- Clade: Eudicots
- Clade: Rosids
- Order: Fabales
- Family: Fabaceae
- Subfamily: Faboideae
- Genus: Lonchocarpus
- Species: L. vallicola

Binomial name
- Lonchocarpus vallicola (Standl. & F.J.Herm.) M.Sousa

Synonyms
- Terua vallicola Standl. & F.J.Herm.

Species of legume

Lonchocarpus vallicola, synonym Terua vallicola, is a species of legume in the family Fabaceae. It is endemic to Honduras.
