= Lonchocarpus calcaratus =

Conservation status
- Vulnerable (IUCN 2.3)

Scientific classification
- Kingdom: Plantae
- Clade: Tracheophytes
- Clade: Angiosperms
- Clade: Eudicots
- Clade: Rosids
- Order: Fabales
- Family: Fabaceae
- Subfamily: Faboideae
- Genus: Lonchocarpus
- Species: L. calcaratus

Binomial name
- Lonchocarpus calcaratus Hermann

Species of legume

Lonchocarpus calcaratus is a species of legume in the family Fabaceae. It is found in Costa Rica and Panama. It is threatened by habitat loss.
