= Rotenoid =

Naturally occurring substance

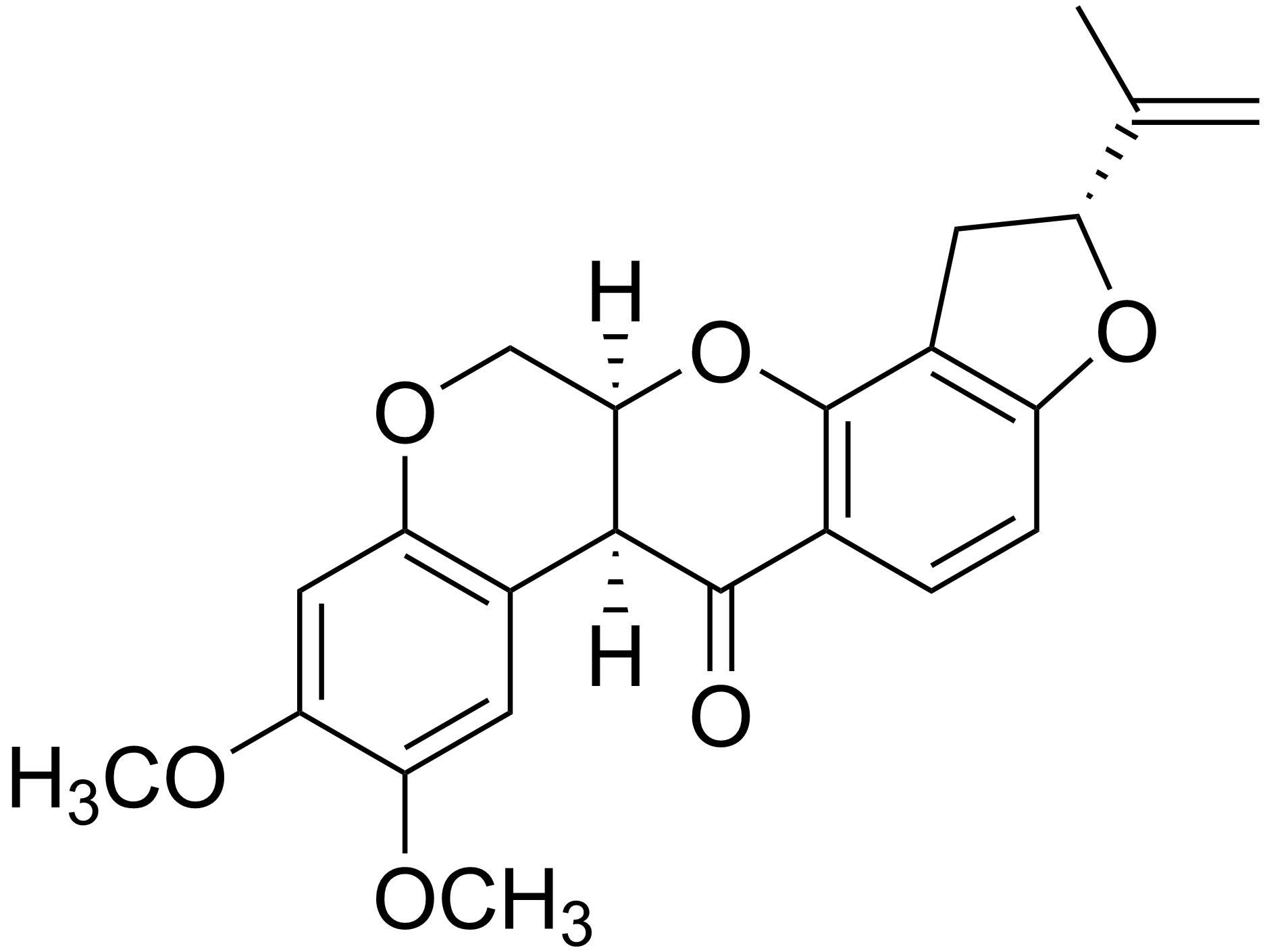
Rotenone

Rotenoids are naturally occurring substances containing a cis-fused tetrahydrochromeno[3,4-b]chromene nucleus. Many have insecticidal and piscicidal activity, such as the prototypical member of the family, rotenone. Rotenoids are related to the isoflavones.

== Natural occurrences ==
Many plants in the subfamily Faboideae contain rotenoids. Rotenoids can be found in Lonchocarpus sp. Deguelin and tephrosin can be found in Tephrosia vogelii. 6'-O-β-D-glucopyranosyl-12a-hydroxydalpanol can be found in the fruits of Amorpha fruticosa. Elliptol, 12-deoxo-12alpha-methoxyelliptone, 6-methoxy-6a,12a-dehydrodeguelin, 6a,12a-dehydrodeguelin, 6-hydroxy-6a,12a-dehydrodeguelin, 6-oxo-6a,12a-dehydrodeguelin and 12a-hydroxyelliptone can be isolated from the twigs of Millettia duchesnei. Deguelin, dehydrodeguelin, rotenol, rotenone, tephrosin and sumatrol can be found in Indigofera tinctoria. 6aα,12aα-12a-hydroxyelliptone can be found in the stems of Derris trifoliata. Amorphol, a rotenoid bioside, can be isolated from plants of the genus Amorpha. Deguelin, rotenone, elliptone and α-toxicarol can be found in the seeds of Lonchocarpus salvadorensis. Clitoriacetal, stemonacetal, 6-deoxyclitoriacetal, 11-deoxyclitoriacetal, 9-demethylclitoriacetal and stemonal can be isolated from Clitoria fairchildiana.

Rotenoids can also be found in the plant family Nyctaginaceae. Mirabijalone A, B, C and D, 9-O-methyl-4-hydroxyboeravinone B, boeravinone C and F, and 1,2,3,4-tetrahydro-1-methylisoquinoline-7,8-diol) can be isolated from the roots of Mirabilis jalapa. Boeravinones G and H are two rotenoids isolated from Boerhavia diffusa. Abronione and boeravinone C can be found in the desert annual Abronia villosa. In 2015, a new rotenoid called crocetenone was extracted from the rhizome of Iris crocea.

== Additional information ==
- Rotenoids on www.chemicool.com
