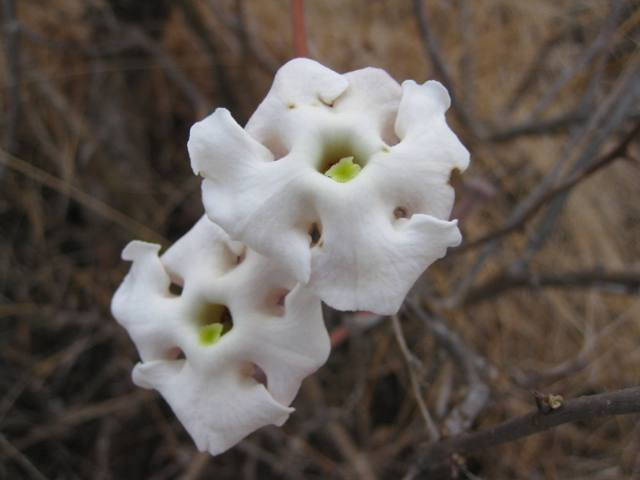

Scientific classification
- Kingdom: Plantae
- Clade: Tracheophytes
- Clade: Angiosperms
- Clade: Eudicots
- Clade: Asterids
- Order: Lamiales
- Family: Pedaliaceae
- Genus: Sesamothamnus
- Species: S. rivae

Binomial name
- Sesamothamnus rivae Engl.

Synonyms
- Sesamothamnus erlangeri Engl.; Sesamothamnus smithii Baker ex Stapf

= Sesamothamnus rivae =

Species of flowering plant

Sesamothamnus rivae is a species of flowering plant in the family Pedaliaceae. It is a caudiciform shrub or small tree native to eastern Africa, where it is found in Ethiopia, Kenya, Somalia, and Tanzania. The plant is known for its swollen, water-storing trunk (pachycaul) and is adapted to seasonally dry tropical biomes.

== Taxonomy ==
The species was first described by the German botanist Adolf Engler in 1897, based on collections made from eastern Africa. The specific epithet rivae honors the Italian naturalist and explorer Oreste Riva.

Two names have been synonymized with Sesamothamnus rivae:

- Sesamothamnus erlangeri Engl. (1902)
- Sesamothamnus smithii Baker ex Stapf (1906)

The genus Sesamothamnus is closely related to Sesamum (the genus that includes sesame), and both belong to the family Pedaliaceae.

== Description ==
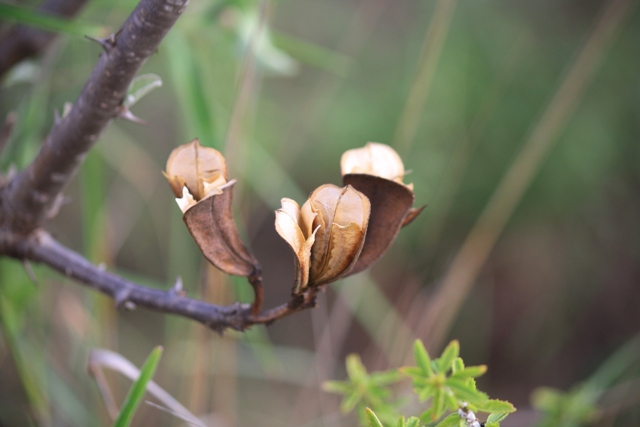
Mature seed pods

Sesamothamnus rivae is a pachycaul shrub or small tree with a disproportionately large, swollen trunk that stores water. The trunk can reach up to 30 cm (12 in) in diameter, while the plant attains a height of 2 to 6 m (6.6 to 19.7 ft).

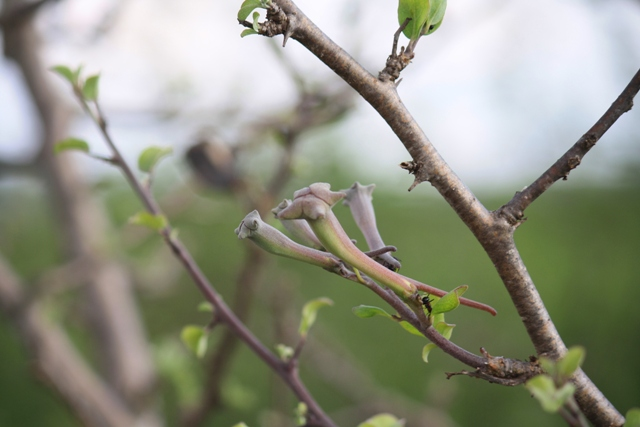
Flower buds

The flowers are small, star-shaped, and range in color from white to brownish-white, with a reddish throat.

A herbarium specimen collected in Ethiopia's Segen River valley in 1982 describes a tree approximately 6 m (20 ft) high with "salsh orange" characteristics, growing in arid Acacia woodland and riparian Ficus forest.

== Distribution and habitat ==
The species is native to eastern Africa, with a range extending from Ethiopia southward to northern Tanzania. Its confirmed distribution includes Ethiopia, Kenya, Somalia, and Tanzania. The plant grows primarily in seasonally dry tropical biomes, including arid woodlands and savannas.

Herbarium records from the Muséum national d'Histoire naturelle in Paris document two preserved specimens of the species.

== Ecology ==
Sesamothamnus rivae is deciduous, losing its leaves during the dry winter period and entering a state of vegetative rest.

The flowers are likely pollinated by insects, though specific pollinators have not been documented in published literature.

== Uses ==
The plant is cultivated as an ornamental plant by succulent enthusiasts due to its distinctive caudiciform growth form.

== Cultivation ==
=== Growing conditions ===
The plant prefers warm tropical temperatures ranging from 20 to 35 °C (68 to 95 °F), and cannot tolerate temperatures below 15 °C (59 °F) or freezing conditions. In cultivation, it requires protection from frost and should be kept dry during its winter dormancy period.

=== Soil and water ===
Well-draining, sandy soils are essential for successful cultivation, as the plant is susceptible to root rot in waterlogged conditions. A cactus or succulent potting mix is recommended. During the active growing season, the plant requires regular watering, but water should be withheld when the plant loses its leaves in winter.

== Conservation ==
As of 2026, Sesamothamnus rivae has not been assessed for the IUCN Red List. The species is known from multiple locations across four countries and does not currently face any documented major threats.
