= Emmanuel Geoffroy =

French explorer

Emmanuel Geoffroy (1862 December 12, Saintes–1894) was a French botanist and explorer.

Geoffroy traveled to Martinique and French Guiana in search of latex-yielding trees, but also studied the region's native plants in the genus Robinia after learning that forest Indians of French Guiana used Robinia as fish poisons. One in particular, "Robinia" nicou, which is now considered to be Lonchocarpus nicou, was to be the subject of his thesis, French: Contribution à l'étude du Robinia Nicou Aubl. au point de vue botanique, chimique et physiologique.

In a fact to be discovered posthumously, Geoffroy unknowingly discovered rotenone, which he originally named nicouline.

He died in 1894 as a result of a parasitic disease.
