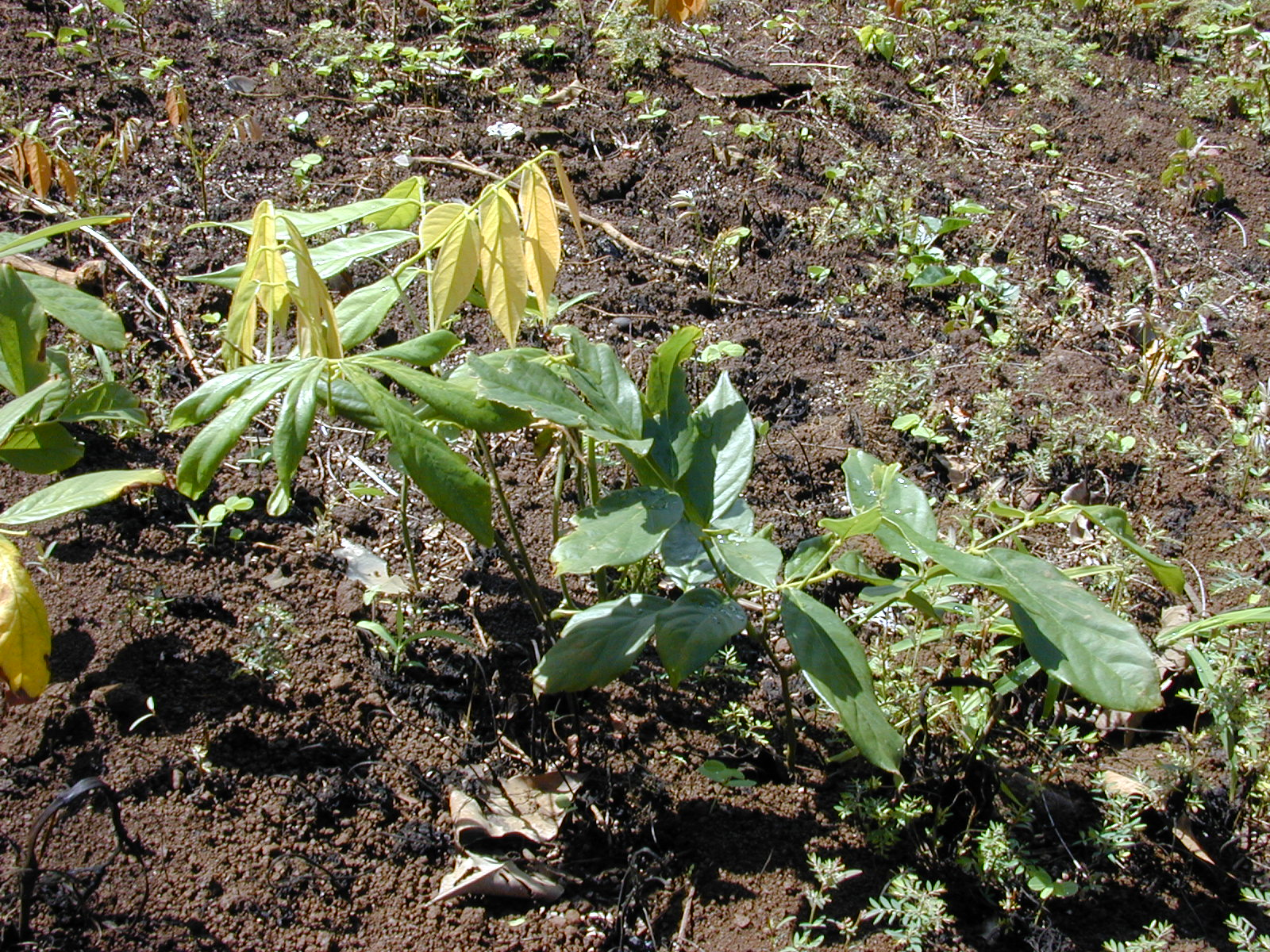

Scientific classification
- Kingdom: Plantae
- Clade: Tracheophytes
- Clade: Angiosperms
- Clade: Eudicots
- Clade: Rosids
- Order: Fabales
- Family: Fabaceae
- Subfamily: Faboideae
- Genus: Derris
- Species: D. elliptica

Binomial name
- Derris elliptica (Wall.) Benth.

Synonyms
- Cylista piscatoria Blanco; Deguelia elliptica (Benth.) Taub. Derris elliptica var. elliptica Galactia termimaliflora Blanco; Galedupa elliptica Roxb. Millettia piscatoria Merr. Millettia splendidissima S.Vidal; Pongamia elliptica Wall. Pongamia volubilis Zoll. & Moritzi

= Derris elliptica =

Species of plant

Derris eliptica is a species of leguminous plant from Southeast Asia and the southwest Pacific islands, including New Guinea. The roots of D. elliptica contain rotenone, a strong insecticide and fish poison.

Also known as derris powder and tuba root (in Indonesia), it was formerly used as an organic insecticide used to control pests on crops such as peas. However, due to the high acute toxicity of rotenone to which the powder is often refined, it is unsafe despite its popularity with organic growers.

Derris root, when crushed, releases rotenone. Some native residents of Fiji and New Guinea practice a form of fishing in which they crush the roots and throw them into the water. The stunned or killed fish float to the surface where they can be easily reached.

Despite its toxicity, Derris is used as a food plant by Lepidopteran larvae including Batrachedra amydraula.

== Subspecies ==
The following subspecies are listed:

- Derris elliptica chittagongensis
- Derris elliptica elliptica
- Derris elliptica malacensis
- Derris elliptica tonkinensis

== See also ==
- "Derris" insecticides based on rotenone
