= Lonchocarpus castilloi =

Conservation status
- Least Concern (IUCN 3.1)

Scientific classification
- Kingdom: Plantae
- Clade: Tracheophytes
- Clade: Angiosperms
- Clade: Eudicots
- Clade: Rosids
- Order: Fabales
- Family: Fabaceae
- Subfamily: Faboideae
- Genus: Lonchocarpus
- Species: L. castilloi

Binomial name
- Lonchocarpus castilloi Standl.

Species of plant

Lonchocarpus castilloi is a species of flowering plant in the family Fabaceae.
