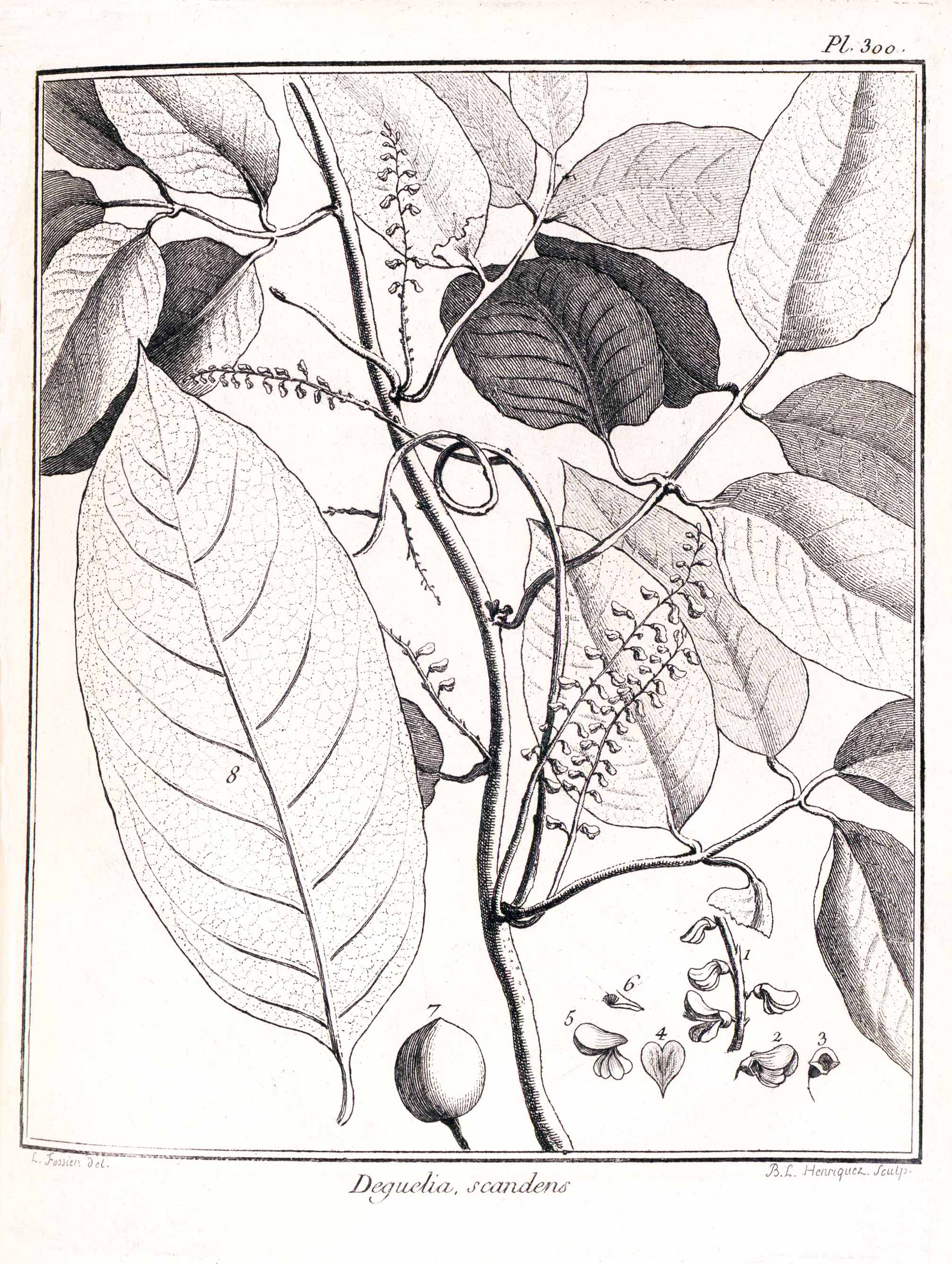
- Deguelia scandens

Scientific classification
- Kingdom: Plantae
- Clade: Embryophytes
- Clade: Tracheophytes
- Clade: Spermatophytes
- Clade: Angiosperms
- Clade: Eudicots
- Clade: Rosids
- Order: Fabales
- Family: Fabaceae
- Subfamily: Faboideae
- Tribe: Millettieae
- Genus: Deguelia; Aubl. (1775)

Species
- 21; see text

Synonyms
- Phyllocarpus Riedel ex Endl. (1842)

= Deguelia =

Genus of legumes

Deguelia is a genus of flowering plants in the family Fabaceae. It belongs to the subfamily Faboideae. It includes ten species native to the tropical Americas, ranging from Nicaragua to Bolivia and southeastern Brazil.

- Deguelia amazonica Killip
- Deguelia angulata (Ducke) A.M.G.Azevedo & R.A.Camargo
- Deguelia chrysophylla (Kleinhoonte) R.A.Camargo & A.M.G.Azevedo
- Deguelia costata (Benth.) A.M.G.Azevedo & R.A.Camargo
- Deguelia dasycalyx (Harms) A.M.G.Azevedo & R.A.Camargo
- Deguelia decorticans R.A.Camargo & A.M.G.Azevedo
- Deguelia densiflora (Benth.) A.M.G.Azevedo ex M.Sousa
- Deguelia duckeana A.M.G.Azevedo
- Deguelia glaucifolia A.M.G.Azevedo
- Deguelia hatschbachii A.M.G.Azevedo
- Deguelia martynii (A.C.Sm.) R.A.Camargo & A.M.G.Azevedo
- Deguelia negrensis (Benth.) Taub.
- Deguelia nitidula (Benth.) A.M.G.Azevedo & R.A.Camargo
- Deguelia occidentalis (Ducke) A.M.G.Azevedo & R.A.Camargo
- Deguelia picta (Pittier) R.A.Camargo & A.M.G.Azevedo
- Deguelia rariflora (Mart. ex Benth.) G.P.Lewis & Acev.-Rodr.
- Deguelia rufescens (Benth.) R.A.Camargo & A.M.G.Azevedo
- Deguelia scandens Aubl.
- Deguelia spruceana (Benth.) A.M.G.Azevedo & R.A.Camargo
- Deguelia urucu (Killip & A.C.Sm.) A.M.G.Azevedo & R.A.Camargo
- Deguelia utilis (A.C.Sm.) A.M.G.Azevedo
