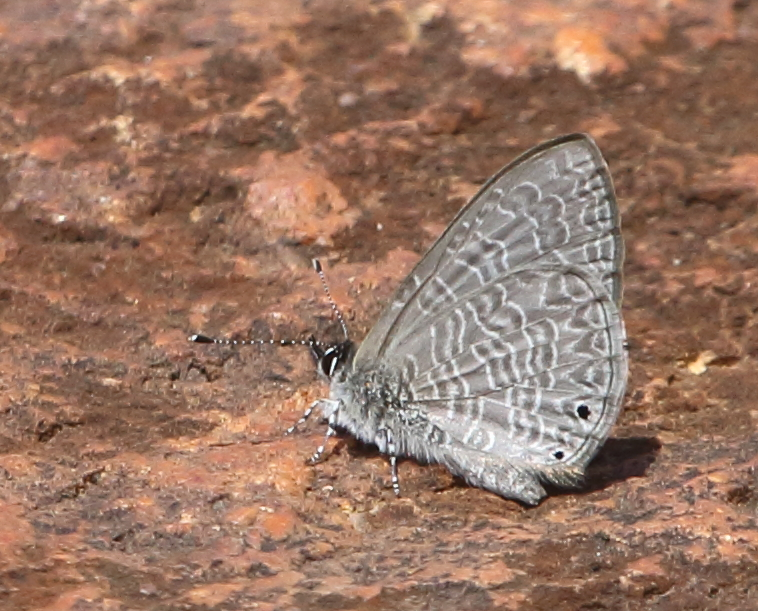
- Pseudonacaduba sichela

Scientific classification
- Domain: Eukaryota
- Kingdom: Animalia
- Phylum: Arthropoda
- Class: Insecta
- Order: Lepidoptera
- Family: Lycaenidae
- Subfamily: Polyommatinae
- Tribe: Polyommatini
- Genus: Pseudonacaduba; Stempffer, 1942

= Pseudonacaduba =

Butterfly genus in family Lycaenidae

Pseudonacaduba is a genus of butterflies in the family Lycaenidae.

== Species ==
- Pseudonacaduba aethiops (Mabille, 1877)
- Pseudonacaduba sichela (Wallengren, 1857)
