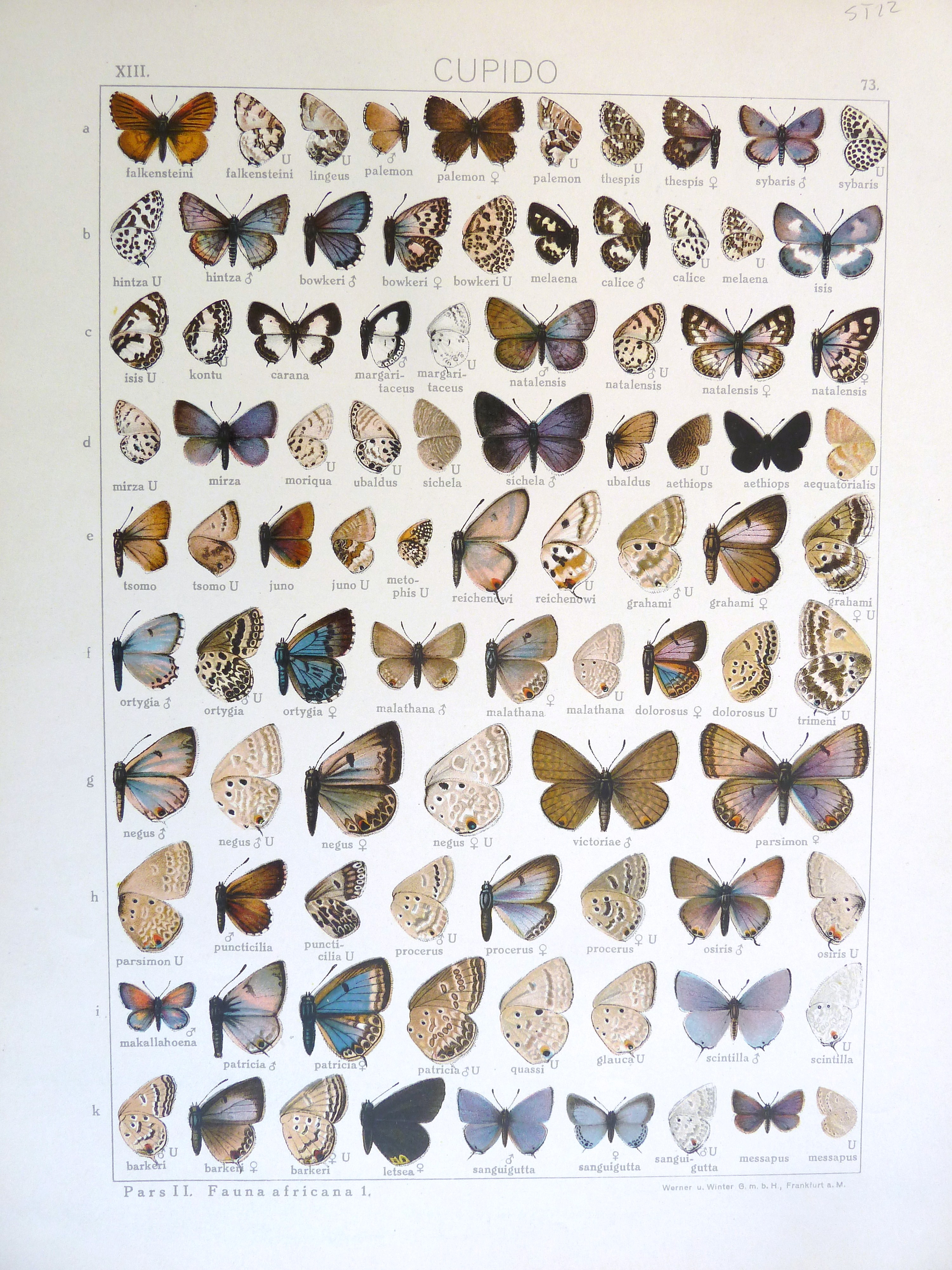

Scientific classification
- Domain: Eukaryota
- Kingdom: Animalia
- Phylum: Arthropoda
- Class: Insecta
- Order: Lepidoptera
- Family: Lycaenidae
- Genus: Pseudonacaduba
- Species: P. aethiops

Binomial name
- Pseudonacaduba aethiops (Mabille, 1877)

Synonyms
- Lycaena aethiops Mabille, 1877; Lycaena melania Capronnier, 1889; Nacaduba stratola Holland, 1891

= Pseudonacaduba aethiops =

Species of butterfly

Pseudonacaduba aethiops, the dark line blue or dark African line blue, is a butterfly in the family Lycaenidae. It is found in Africa from Nigeria (east and the Cross River loop) to western Kenya and Zambia. The habitat consists of forests.

Adult males visit damp patches to drink.

The larvae feed on Mundulea species.
