= Lonchocarpus pluvialis =

Scientific classification
- Kingdom: Plantae
- Clade: Tracheophytes
- Clade: Angiosperms
- Clade: Eudicots
- Clade: Rosids
- Order: Fabales
- Family: Fabaceae
- Subfamily: Faboideae
- Genus: Lonchocarpus
- Species: L. pluvialis

Binomial name
- Lonchocarpus pluvialis Rusby

Species of legume

Lonchocarpus pluvialis, commonly known as cuquí in the eastern Bolivian departments of Santa Cruz and the Beni to which it is endemic, is a species of lancepod that typically grows to a height of 10 to 15 meters and is known for attracting large swarms of honeybees. Bolivians commonly distinguish between two varieties of the plant: one with yellow flowers and one with white. The flexible bark of L. pluvialis has traditionally been used to make small, flimsy boxes that serve as containers for cut tobacco, candies, or sewing supplies.
