= Xtabentún (liqueur) =

Liqueur made of anise seeds and fermented honey in Yucatán region

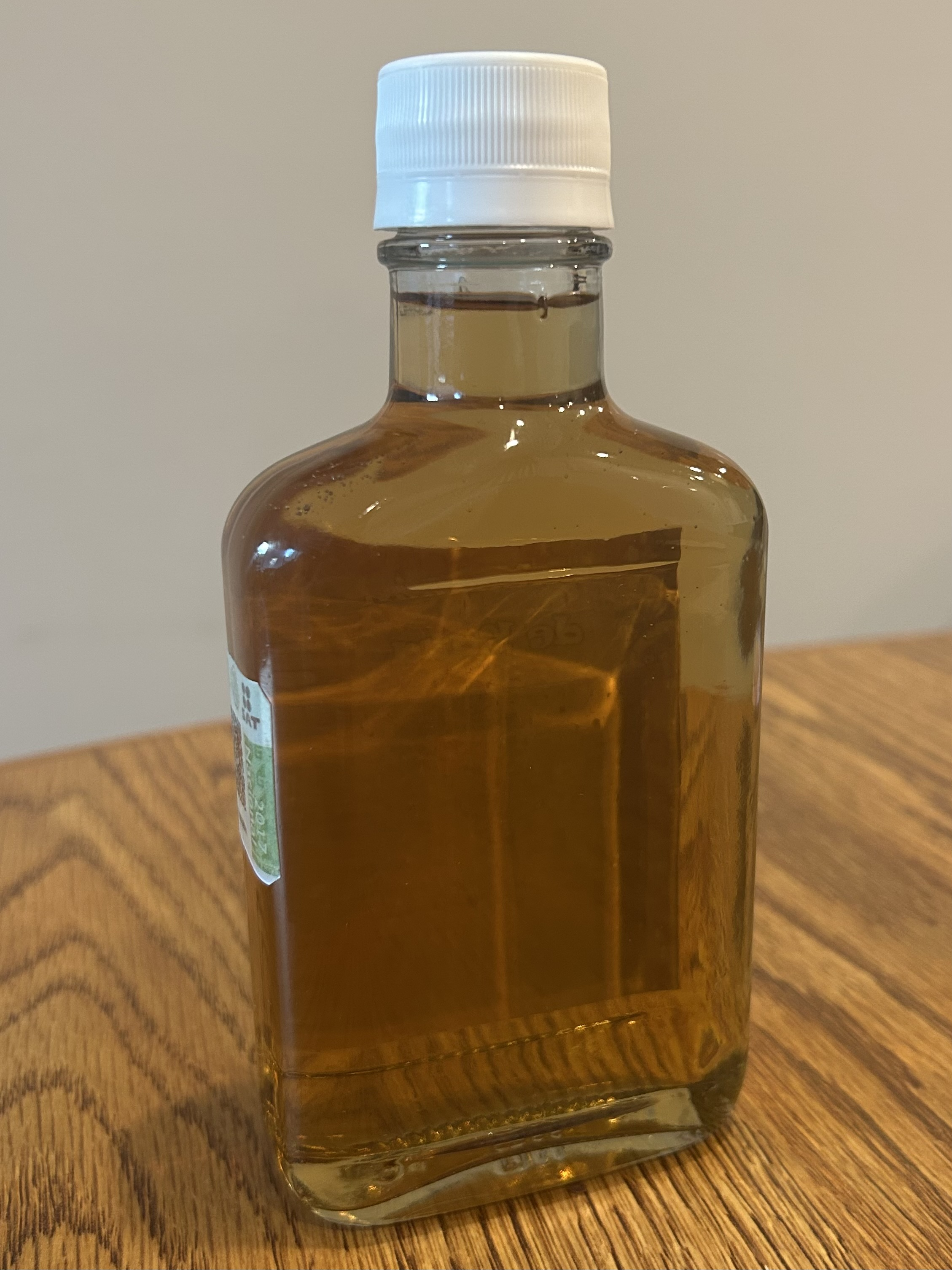
Bottle of Xtabentún

Xtabentún (Spanish pronunciation: [(i)ʃtaβenˈtun]) is an anise liqueur made in Mexico's Yucatán region from anise seed and fermented honey produced by honey bees from the nectar of xtabentún flowers. Rum is then added to the anise and honey mixture. Because of the rum content, the xtabentún liqueur is sometimes called a "distilled honey" beverage, which is misleading, because the honey alcohol is fermented, not distilled. It is, nonetheless, a spirit beverage, since rum, a distilled product, is added. Distilleries still survive today in the Yucatán that produce the liqueur.

== Origin ==
Xtabentún may have its origin in balché, a ceremonial liquor produced by the Maya. The strong flavor did not appeal to the Spanish conquistadores, so they introduced anise and took away the tree bark and corn.

== Etymology ==
The word xtabentún means "vines growing on stone" in the Mayan language. It refers to the Christmas vine (Turbina corymbosa), a species of morning glory whose seeds contain ergine and have hallucinogenic properties. This has led Jonathan Ott to suggest that balché may also have had entheogenic qualities, although this remains to be demonstrated. Ancient Mayas likely would have enjoyed the inebriating effects of a similar beverage to produce visionary and trance states.

== Use ==
It is usually served straight, cold, or with ice and honey. It can also be served with coffee, or with one shot of tequila and an equal part xtabentún, creating a drink called "Mayan coffee." Adding half a lime makes a "Maya margarita". When mixed with wine, it is called olhombre which means "clashing" in Yukatek (Màaya t'àan).
