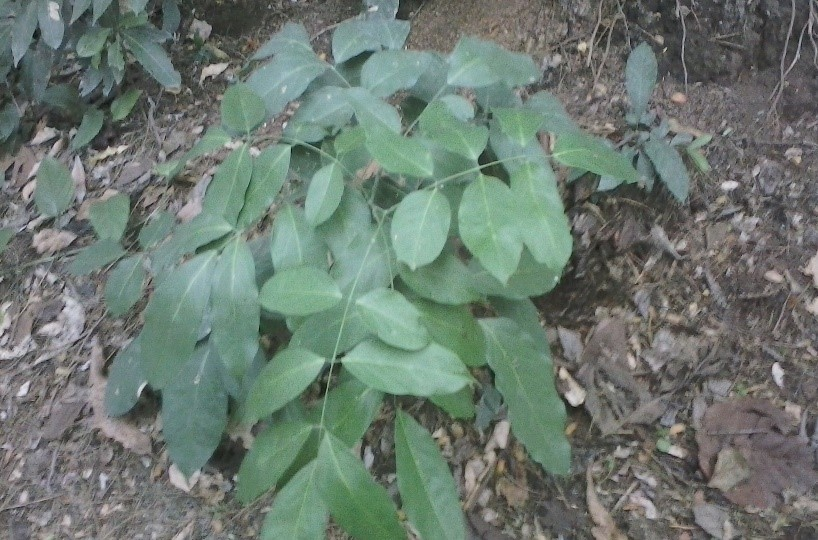

Conservation status
- Least Concern (IUCN 2.3)

Scientific classification
- Kingdom: Plantae
- Clade: Tracheophytes
- Clade: Angiosperms
- Clade: Eudicots
- Clade: Rosids
- Order: Fabales
- Family: Fabaceae
- Subfamily: Faboideae
- Genus: Lonchocarpus
- Species: L. retifer

Binomial name
- Lonchocarpus retifer Standley & L.O.Williams

Synonyms
- Lonchocarpus retiferus Standley & L.O.Williams, orth. var.

= Lonchocarpus retifer =

Species of legume

Lonchocarpus retifer is a species of legume in the family Fabaceae. It is native to Central America: Costa Rica, El Salvador, Honduras and Nicaragua. Its scientific name has also been spelt Lonchocarpus retiferus.
