= Lonchocarpus violaceus =

Scientific classification
- Kingdom: Plantae
- Clade: Tracheophytes
- Clade: Angiosperms
- Clade: Eudicots
- Clade: Rosids
- Order: Fabales
- Family: Fabaceae
- Subfamily: Faboideae
- Genus: Lonchocarpus
- Species: L. violaceus

Binomial name
- Lonchocarpus violaceus (Jacq.) Kunth

Synonyms
- Robinia violaceae Jacq.; Dalbergia violaceae (Jacq.) Hoffsgg.; Lonchocarpus benthamianus Pittier; Lonchocarpus caribaeus Urb.

Species of legume

Lonchocarpus violaceus is a species of evergreen tree in the family Fabaceae. It is native to the Caribbean and northern South America. It has been introduced to Florida. Its names include lilac tree, greenheart, Spanish ash, and lancepod.

According to some sources L. violaceus was used by the Maya peoples to produce the alcoholic beverage, balché. It is likely they are actually referring to L. longistylus which was once synonymized with L. violaceus.
