= Deguelia utilis =

Scientific classification
- Kingdom: Plantae
- Clade: Tracheophytes
- Clade: Angiosperms
- Clade: Eudicots
- Clade: Rosids
- Order: Fabales
- Family: Fabaceae
- Subfamily: Faboideae
- Genus: Deguelia
- Species: D. utilis

Binomial name
- Deguelia utilis (A.C.Sm.) A.M.G.Azevedo

Synonyms
- Derris utilis (A.C.Sm.); Lonchocarpus nicou var. utilis (A.C.Sm.); Lonchocarpus utilis A.C.Sm.; Deguelia alata M.Sousa; Lonchocarpus nicou var. languidus F.J.Herm.

Species of plant

Deguelia utilis, syn. Lonchocarpus utilis (cubé, (common) lancepod or barbasco) is a species of shrub in the family Fabaceae. It is native to the tropical forests of Peru, as well as of Brazil and Guyana, growing from 100–1,800 m (330–5,910 ft) above sea level.

Cubé resin, the root extract from cubé and from barbasco (Lonchocarpus urucu), is used as a commercial insecticide and piscicide (fish poison). The major active ingredients are rotenone and deguelin. Although "organic" (produced by nature) rotenone is no longer considered an environmentally safe chemical.

== Miscellaneous ==
Cubé is toxic to insects, fish, and other pets. The primary threat to humans and other mammals comes from inhaling the powdered root or root extract.
