= Lonchocarpus sanctuarii =

Conservation status
- Least Concern (IUCN 3.1)

Scientific classification
- Kingdom: Plantae
- Clade: Tracheophytes
- Clade: Angiosperms
- Clade: Eudicots
- Clade: Rosids
- Order: Fabales
- Family: Fabaceae
- Subfamily: Faboideae
- Genus: Lonchocarpus
- Species: L. sanctuarii

Binomial name
- Lonchocarpus sanctuarii Standl. & L.O.Williams

Species of legume

Lonchocarpus sanctuarii is a species of plant in the family Fabaceae. It is a tree native to southeastern Mexico, El Salvador, Honduras, and Nicaragua.
