= Lonchocarpus santarosanus =

Conservation status
- Vulnerable (IUCN 2.3)

Scientific classification
- Kingdom: Plantae
- Clade: Tracheophytes
- Clade: Angiosperms
- Clade: Eudicots
- Clade: Rosids
- Order: Fabales
- Family: Fabaceae
- Subfamily: Faboideae
- Genus: Lonchocarpus
- Species: L. santarosanus

Binomial name
- Lonchocarpus santarosanus J.D.Smith

Species of plant

Lonchocarpus santarosanus, the chapelno blanco, is a species of plant in the family Fabaceae. It is found in El Salvador and Guatemala. It is threatened by habitat loss.
