= Balché =

Mildly intoxicating Maya drink

Balché is a mildly intoxicating beverage that was commonly consumed by the ancient Maya in what is now Mexico and upper Central America. Today, it is still common among the Maya. The drink is made from the bark of a leguminous tree, Lonchocarpus violaceus, which is soaked in honey and water, and fermented. A closely related beverage, made from honey produced from the nectar of a species of morning glory (Turbina corymbosa), is called xtabentún.

Ritual enemas and other psychoactive substances were also taken by those who drank balché.

According to food writer Sandor Katz, the ancient Maya consumed balché in enema form to maximize its inebriating effect. After the Maya were conquered by the Spanish, the drink was banned and their orchards were destroyed.

== See also ==
- Pox
- Pulque
