= Lonchocarpus yoroensis =

Conservation status
- Vulnerable (IUCN 3.1)

Scientific classification
- Kingdom: Plantae
- Clade: Tracheophytes
- Clade: Angiosperms
- Clade: Eudicots
- Clade: Rosids
- Order: Fabales
- Family: Fabaceae
- Subfamily: Faboideae
- Genus: Lonchocarpus
- Species: L. yoroensis

Binomial name
- Lonchocarpus yoroensis Standl.

Species of legume

Lonchocarpus yoroensis is a species of plant in the family Fabaceae. It is a tree native to Honduras and Nicaragua.
