= Lonchocarpus chiricanus =

Conservation status
- Vulnerable (IUCN 2.3)

Scientific classification
- Kingdom: Plantae
- Clade: Tracheophytes
- Clade: Angiosperms
- Clade: Eudicots
- Clade: Rosids
- Order: Fabales
- Family: Fabaceae
- Subfamily: Faboideae
- Genus: Lonchocarpus
- Species: L. chiricanus

Binomial name
- Lonchocarpus chiricanus Pitt.

Species of legume

Lonchocarpus chiricanus is a species of plant in the family Fabaceae. It is found only in Panama.
