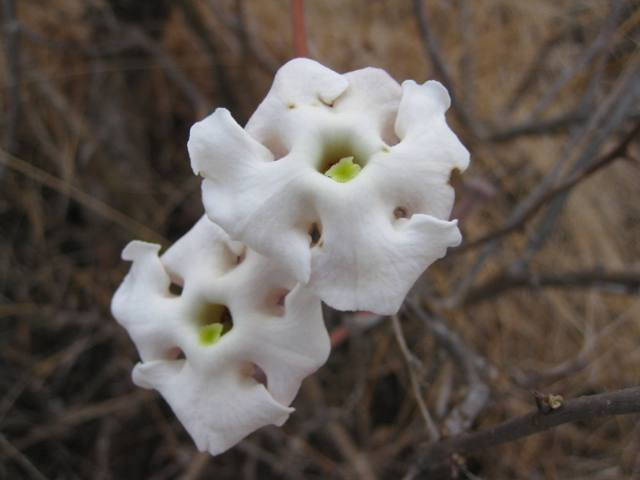
- Sesamothamnus rivae

Scientific classification
- Kingdom: Plantae
- Clade: Tracheophytes
- Clade: Angiosperms
- Clade: Eudicots
- Clade: Asterids
- Order: Lamiales
- Family: Pedaliaceae
- Genus: Sesamothamnus; Welw.

Species
- See text

= Sesamothamnus =

Genus of plants

Sesamothamnus is a genus of plant in the family Pedaliaceae. The genus is found from Ethiopia to South Africa.

== Taxonomy ==
Sesamothamnus was first named and described in 1869 by Friedrich Welwitsch.

=== Species ===
As of June 2024, Plants of the World Online accepts six species for this genus:

- Sesamothamnus benguellensis Welw.
- Sesamothamnus busseanus Engl.
- Sesamothamnus guerichii (Engl.) E.A.Bruce
- Sesamothamnus leistnari P.Craven ex Swanepoel & A.E.van Wyk
- Sesamothamnus lugardii N.E.Br.
- Sesamothamnus rivae Engl.
