= Lonchocarpus urucu =

Scientific classification
- Kingdom: Plantae
- Clade: Tracheophytes
- Clade: Angiosperms
- Clade: Eudicots
- Clade: Rosids
- Order: Fabales
- Family: Fabaceae
- Subfamily: Faboideae
- Genus: Lonchocarpus
- Species: L. urucu

Binomial name
- Lonchocarpus urucu Killip & A.C.Smith

Species of plant

Lonchocarpus urucu, or barbasco, is plant in the family Fabaceae. It is native to the tropical forests of Peru, as well as of Brazil and Guyana, growing from 100–1,800 metres (330–5,910 ft) above sea level. It was also recorded in Venezuela.

Cubé resin, the root extract from Barbasco and from cubé (Lonchocarpus utilis), is used as a commercial insecticide and piscicide (fish poison). The major active ingredients are rotenone and deguelin. Although "organic" (produced by nature), rotenone is no longer considered an environmentally safe chemical.

== Taxonomic status ==
The taxonomic status as a species with the name Lonchocarpus urucu ist still to be resolved, as it is also considered a variety of Deguelia rufescens: Deguelia rufescens var. urucu (Killip & A.C.Sm.) A.M.G.Azeved.

== Toxicity ==
Barbasco is toxic to insects, fish, and other pests. The primary threat to humans and other mammals comes from inhaling the powdered root or root extract. It has been used by the Shuar people of Ecuador and the Nukak people of Colombia as a poison for fishing.
