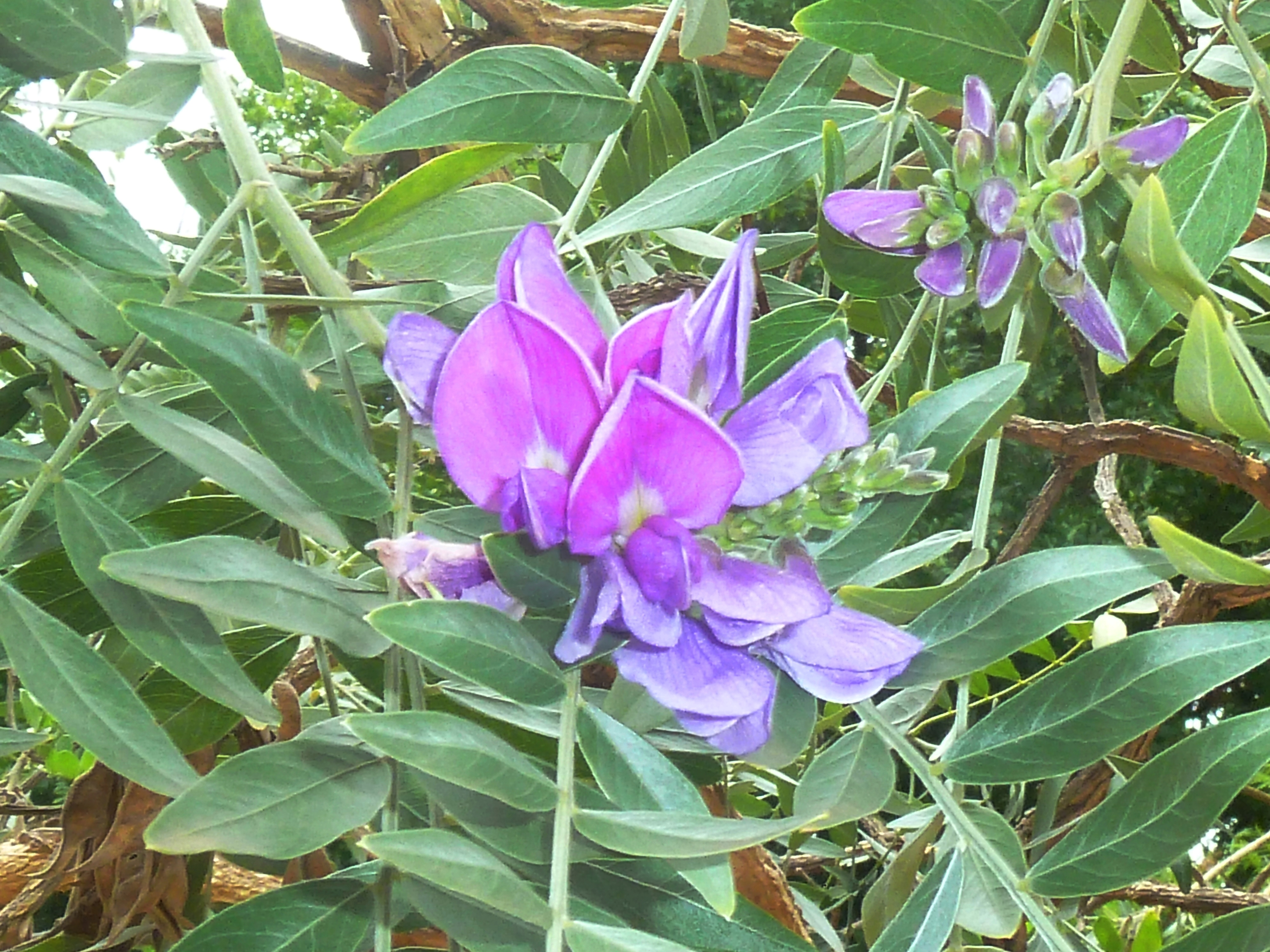

Scientific classification
- Kingdom: Plantae
- Clade: Tracheophytes
- Clade: Angiosperms
- Clade: Eudicots
- Clade: Rosids
- Order: Fabales
- Family: Fabaceae
- Subfamily: Faboideae
- Genus: Mundulea
- Species: M. sericea

Binomial name
- Mundulea sericea (Willd.) A.Chev. (1925)

Synonyms
- Cytisus sericeus Willd. (1802); Dalbergia sericea (Willd.) Bojer (1837), nom. illeg.; Tephrosia sericea (Willd.) DC. (1825), nom. illeg.

= Mundulea sericea =

Species of shrub or small tree

Mundulea sericea, the cork bush, is an attractive shrub or small tree which is found in relatively open woodlands of Africa and South Asia. It is the only member of the genus with a range extending beyond Madagascar, and it resembles some African shrubs in the related genus Tephrosia.

== Range ==
The species occurs commonly in Madagascar, southern to central Africa, India and Sri Lanka. At its southern limit it is found in northern KwaZulu-Natal and northwards of the Vaal River, South Africa. It has a preference for rocky slopes but is also found in savanna.

Two subspecies are recognized.

- Mundulea sericea subsp. madagascariensis Du Puy & Labat (syn. Mundulea striata) – endemic to Madagascar
- Mundulea sericea subsp. sericea – mainland tropical Africa, India, and Sri Lanka

== Description ==
The compound, alternate leaves are covered in silky hairs. The papilionaceous flowers are mauve to purple in colour. The seed pods are up to 8 cm long, and are covered in golden brown, velvety hairs. These hairs turn grey with time, and the pods may remain on the tree up to the next flowering season, or longer. The bark of the stem and main branches is deeply grooved and corky, and contains the poison rotenone. The leaves are however browsed by animals.

== Gallery ==
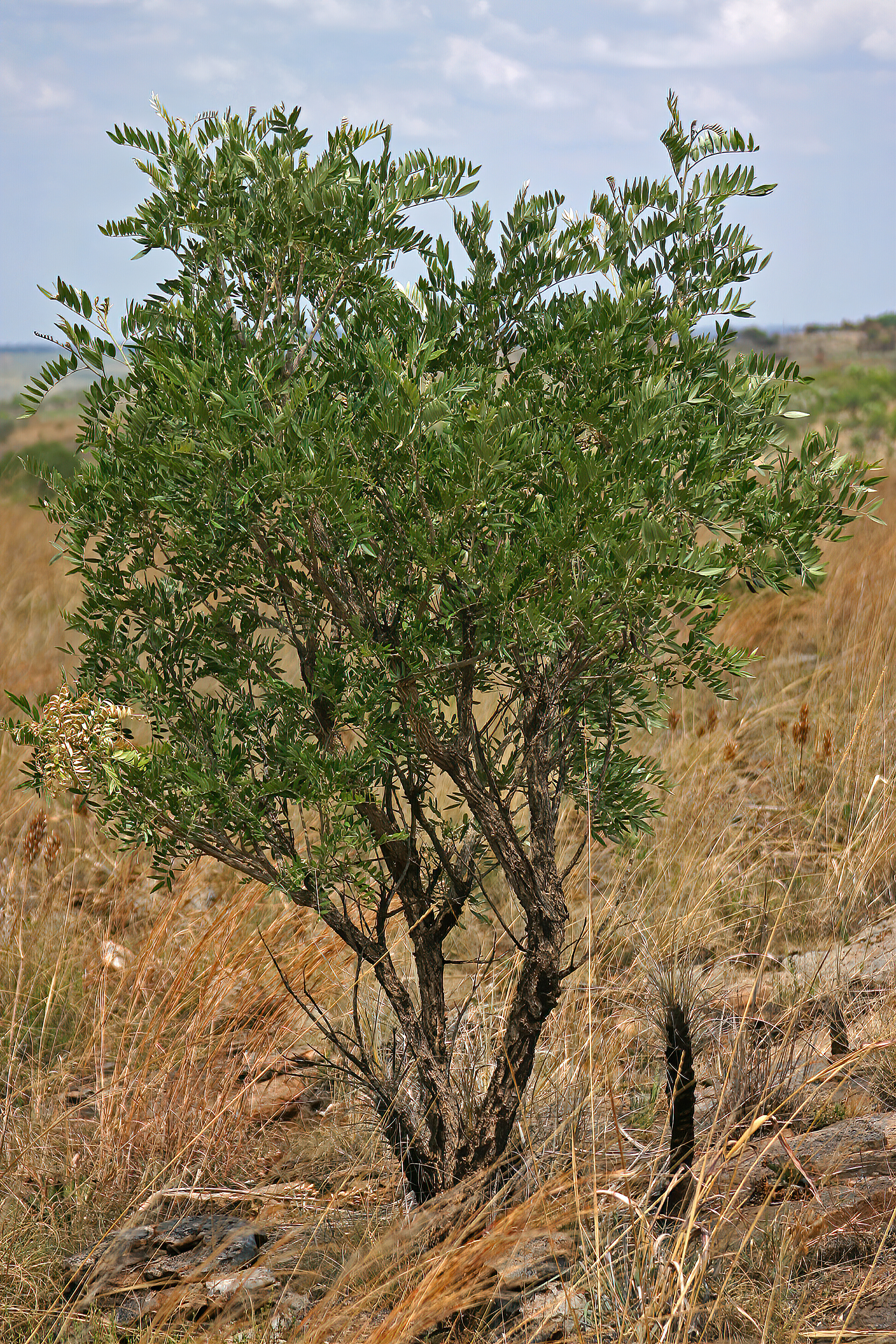
habit

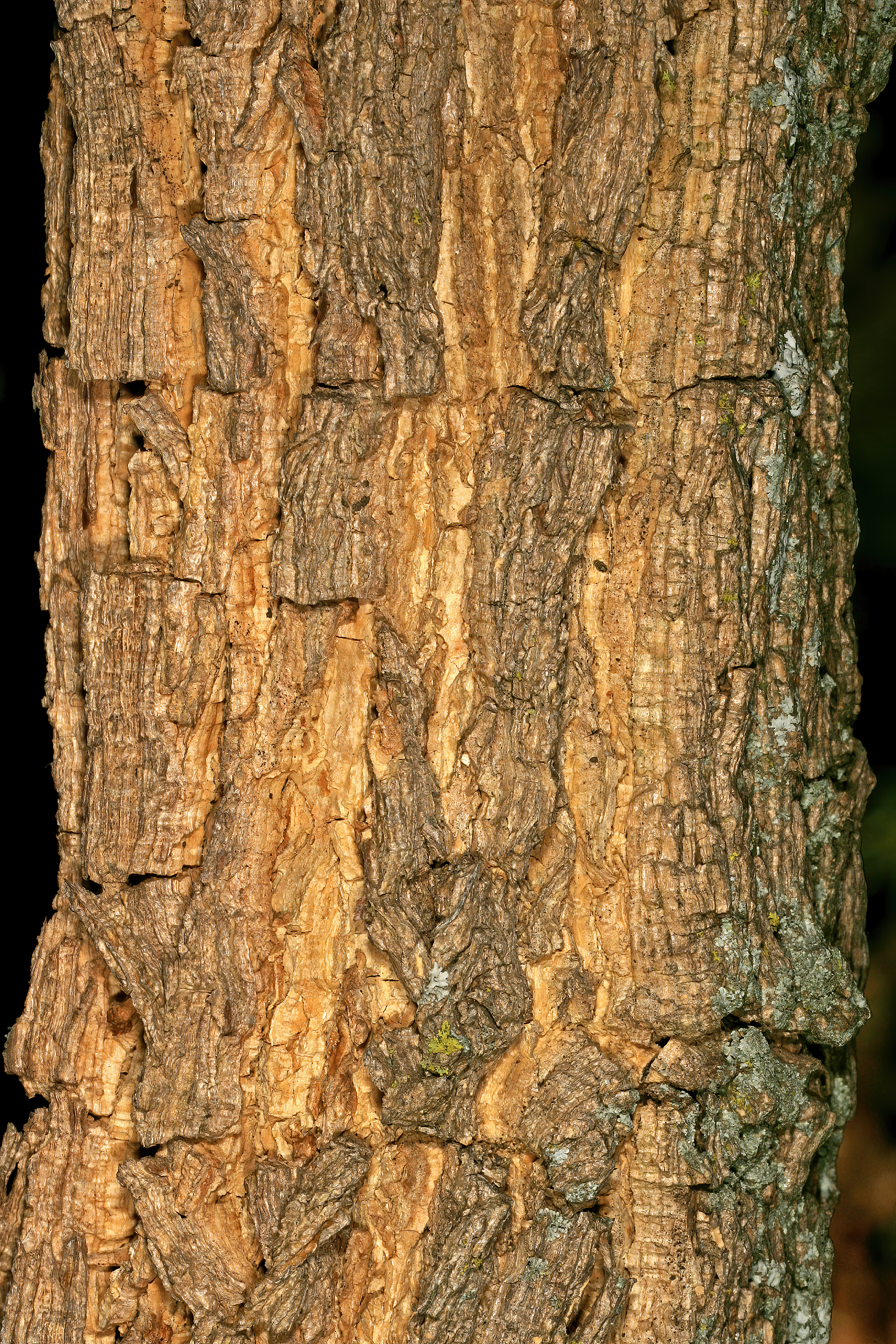
bark

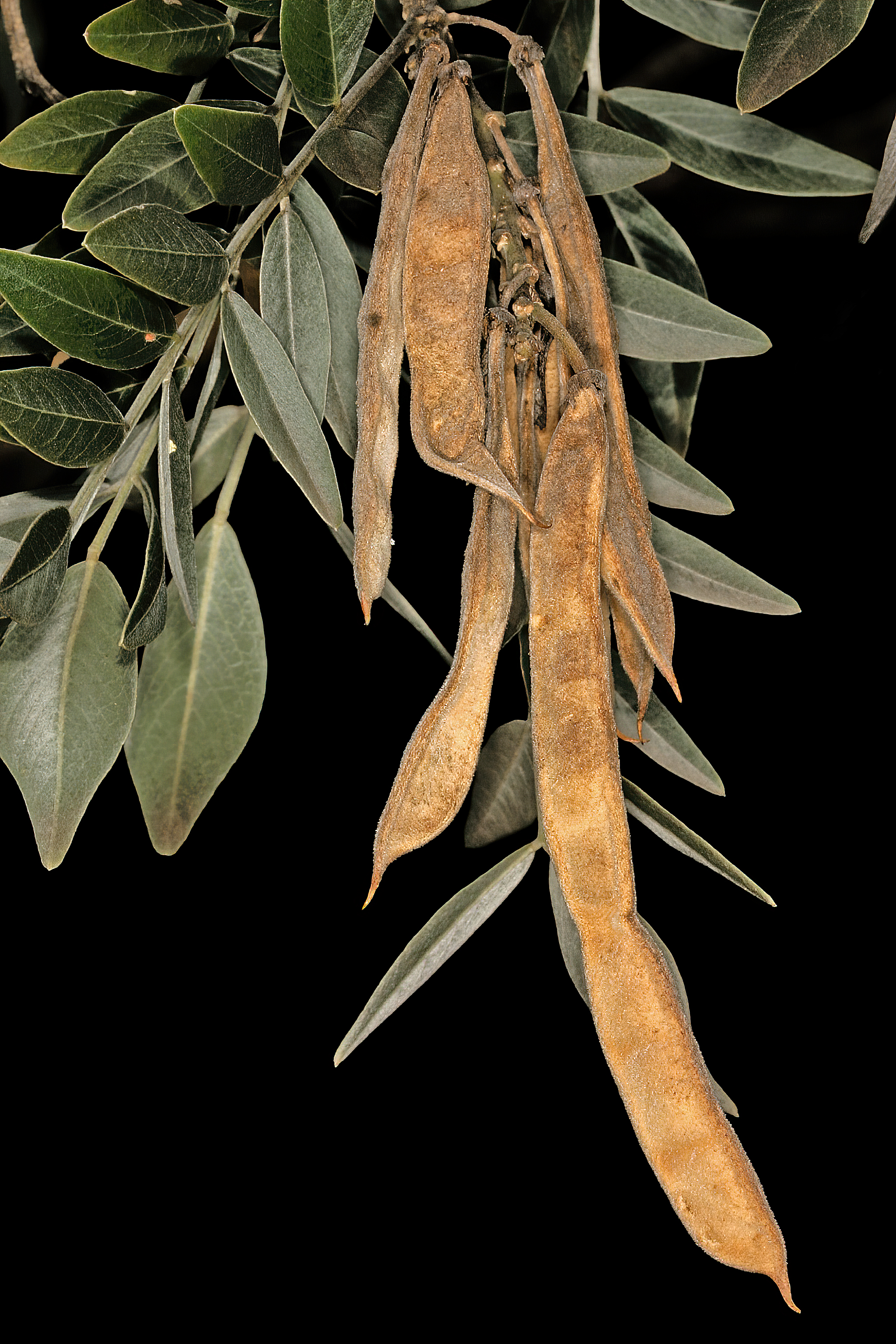
seed pods
