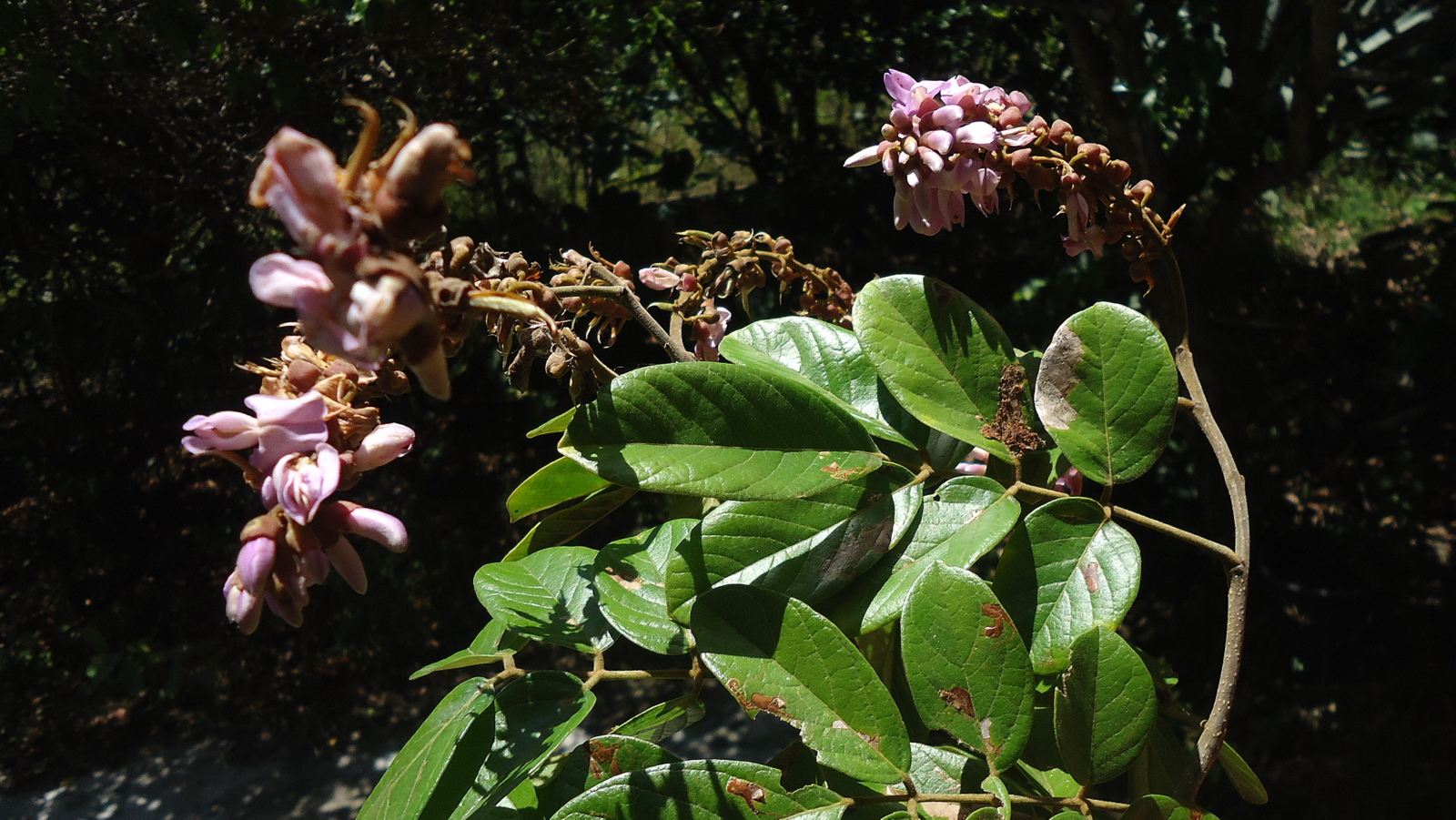
- Lonchocarpus sericeus, the type species of the genus

Scientific classification
- Kingdom: Plantae
- Clade: Embryophytes
- Clade: Tracheophytes
- Clade: Spermatophytes
- Clade: Angiosperms
- Clade: Eudicots
- Clade: Rosids
- Order: Fabales
- Family: Fabaceae
- Subfamily: Faboideae
- Clade: Millettioids
- Tribe: Millettieae
- Genus: Lonchocarpus; Kunth (1824)

Species
- See list of Lonchocarpus species

Synonyms
- Capassa Klotzsch (1861); Clompanus Aubl. (1775), nom. rej.; Cyanobotrys Zucc. (1845); Icthyoctonum Boivin ex Baill. (1884); Neuroscapha Tul. (1843); Terua Standl. & F.J.Herm. (1949); Willardia Rose (1891)

= Lonchocarpus =

Genus of legumes

Lonchocarpus is a plant genus in the legume family (Fabaceae). It includes 166 species native to the tropical Americas, tropical Africa, and Madasgascar. The species are called lancepods due to their fruit resembling an ornate lance tip or a few beads on a string.

Cubé resin is produced from the roots of L. urucu and namely ''L. utilis (cubé). It contains enough of the toxic rotenoids rotenone and deguelin to be used as an insecticide and piscicide. As these are naturally occurring compounds, they were formerly used in organic farming. Since it is highly unselective and kills useful, as well as pest, animals, it is considered harmful to the environment today. Also, chronic exposure to rotenone and deguelin appears to increase the risk of Parkinson's disease, even in mammals, for which these compounds are less immediately toxic than for fish and insects. Deguelin might be useful in cancer therapy if it can be applied directly into tumors, and Lonchocarpus root is used to a probably insignificant extent by indigenous peoples as an aid in fish stunning, e.g. by the Nukak who call it nuún.

The bark of L. violaceus (balché tree) is traditionally used by the Yukatek Maya version of the mildly intoxicating mead, balché, which was held in the highest esteem in antiquity and considered sacred to the god of intoxication. It is still drunk today and was, after the Spanish conquest of Yucatán, considered a less harmful alternative to the alcoholic beverages imported by the Europeans. It is not quite clear if roots were also used to produce balché, and to what extent toxic isoflavones are also present in L. violaceus. The potency of balché may be increased by using honey produced from L. violaceus nectar foraged by the Maya people's traditional stingless bees.

Certain insects have evolved the ability to deal with Lonchocarpus toxins and feed on these plants. They include a possible new Lepidopteran taxon in the two-barred flasher (Astraptes fulgerator) cryptic species complex which seems to have acquired this trait only quite recently in its evolutionary history and is known to be found on L. costaricensis and L. oliganthus.

The type species is Lonchocarpus sericeus.

== Species ==
Selected species include:

- Lonchocarpus calcaratus
- Lonchocarpus chiricanus
- Lonchocarpus minimiflorus
- Lonchocarpus molinae
- Lonchocarpus nitidus
- Lonchocarpus phaseolifolius
- Lonchocarpus phlebophyllus
- Lonchocarpus pluvialis – cuquí
- Lonchocarpus retifer
- Lonchocarpus salvadorensis
- Lonchocarpus sanctuarii
- Lonchocarpus santarosanus – chapelno blanco
- Lonchocarpus trifolius
- Lonchocarpus urucu – barbasco
- Lonchocarpus violaceus
- Lonchocarpus yoroensis
