= Deguelin =

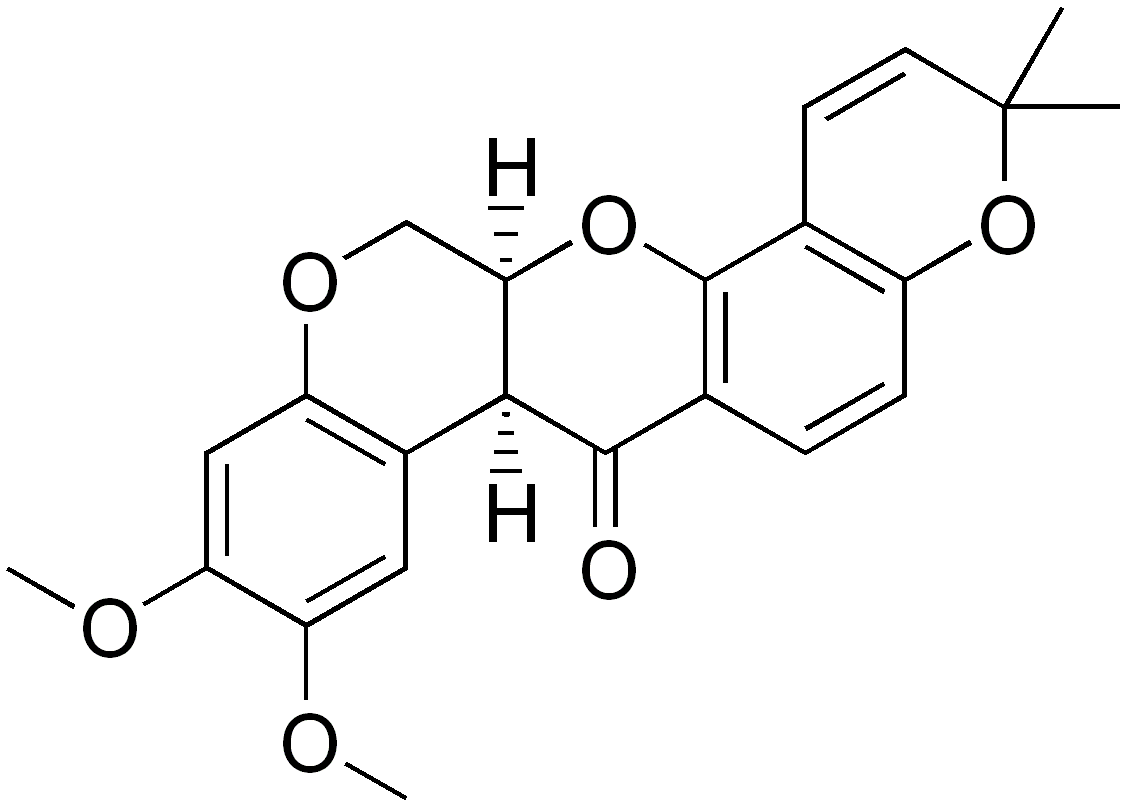

Names
- IUPAC name 4′,5′-Dimethoxy-6′′,6′′-dimethyl-6′′H-pyrano[2′′,3′′:7,8]rotenan-4-one
- Systematic IUPAC name (7aS,13aS)-9,10-Dimethoxy-3,3-dimethyl-13,13a-dihydro-3H-([1]benzopyrano[4,3-e′]benzo[1,2-b:3,4-b′]dipyran)-7(7aH)-one
- Other names Deguelin; 3H-Bis(1)benzopyrano (3,4-b:6',5'-e)pyran-7(7aH)-one, 13,13a-dihydro-9,10-dimethoxy-3,3- dimethyl-, (7aS,13aS)-; 3H-Bis(1) benzopyrano(3,4-b:6',5'-e)pyran- 7(7aH)-one, 13,13a-dihydro- 9, 10-dimethoxy-3,3-dimethyl-, (7aS-cis)-

Identifiers
CAS Number	522-17-8
3D model (JSmol)	Interactive image
ChEBI	CHEBI:4357
ChEMBL	ChEMBL393417
ChemSpider	97058
PubChem CID	107935
UNII	K5Z93K66IE
CompTox Dashboard (EPA)	DTXSID10200231
- InChI: InChI=1S/C23H22O6/c1-23(2)8-7-12-15(29-23)6-5-13-21(24)20-14-9-17(25-3)18(26-4)10-16(14)27-11-19(20)28-22(12)13/h5-10,19-20H,11H2,1-4H3/t19-,20+/m1/s1 Key: ORDAZKGHSNRHTD-UXHICEINSA-N; InChI=1/C23H22O6/c1-23(2)8-7-12-15(29-23)6-5-13-21(24)20-14-9-17(25-3)18(26-4)10-16(14)27-11-19(20)28-22(12)13/h5-10,19-20H,11H2,1-4H3/t19-,20+/m1/s1 Key: ORDAZKGHSNRHTD-UXHICEINBW
- SMILES: O=C2c5c(O[C@@H]3COc1cc(OC)c(OC)cc1[C@H]23)c4\C=C/C(Oc4cc5)(C)C

Properties
Chemical formula	C_{23}H_{22}O_{6}
Molar mass	394.42 g/mol
Melting point	171 °C (340 °F; 444 K)
- Except where otherwise noted, data are given for materials in their standard state (at 25 °C [77 °F], 100 kPa). verify (what is ?) Infobox references

Deguelin is a derivative of rotenone. Both are compounds classified as rotenoids of the flavonoid family and are naturally occurring insecticides. They can be produced by extraction from several plant species belonging to three genera of the legume family, Fabaceae: Lonchocarpus, Derris, or Tephrosia.

Cubé resin, the root extract from cubé (Lonchocarpus utilis) and from barbasco (Lonchocarpus urucu), is used as a commercial insecticide and piscicide (fish poison). The major active ingredients are rotenone and deguelin. Although "organic" (produced by nature) cubé resin is no longer considered environmentally safe.

== Rat pharmacokinetics ==
- Mean residence time (MRT) = 6.98 h
- Terminal half-life (t1/2(gamma)) = 9.26 h
- Area under the curve (AUC) = 57.3 ng h/ml
- Total clearance (Cl) = 4.37 L/h per kg
- Apparent volume of distribution (V) = 3.421 L/kg
- Volume of distribution at steady-state (Vss) = 30.46 L/kg
- Tissue distributions after i.v. (intravenous) administration: heart > fat > mammary gland > colon > liver > kidney > brain > lung.
- Tissue distributions after i.g. (intragastric) administration: perirenal fat > heart > mammary gland > colon > kidney > liver > lung > brain > skin.
- Elimination: Within 5 days of i.g. administration, about 58.1% of the [3H]deguelin was eliminated via the feces and 14.4% via the urine. Approximately 1.7% of unchanged deguelin was found in the feces, and 0.4% in the urine.

== Deguelin and anti-cancer activity ==
Deguelin displays anti-cancer activity by inhibiting the growth of pre-cancerous and cancerous cells - particularly for lung cancer. So far the compound has shown no toxic effects on normal cells. However, high doses of deguelin are suspected of having negative effects on the heart, lungs and nerves. The molecular mechanisms include the induction of apoptosis, mediated through AKT/PKB signaling pathways in malignant and premalignant human bronchial epithelia (HBE) cells, with only minimal effects on normal HBE cells. Deguelin inhibits AKT by both Phosphoinositol-3-phosphate kinase (PI3K)-dependent and PI3K-independent pathways.

== Deguelin and Parkinson's disease ==
Research has shown a correlation between intravenous deguelin and Parkinson's disease in rats. The study does not suggest that deguelin exposure is responsible for Parkinson's disease in humans, but is consistent with the belief that chronic exposure to environmental toxins can increase the likelihood of the disease.
