= Rotenone =

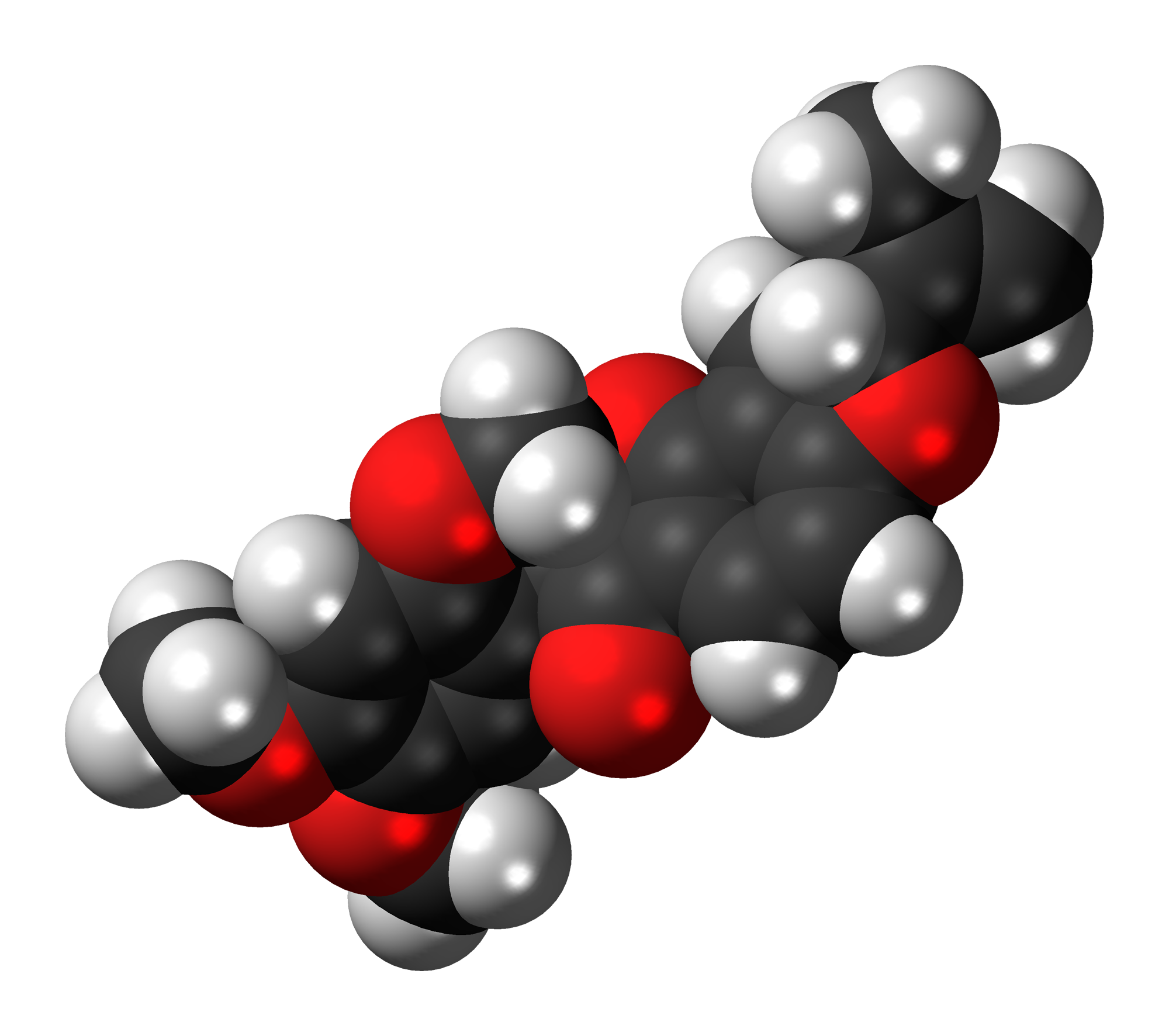

Names
- IUPAC name (5′′R)-4′,5′-Dimethoxy-5′′-(prop-1-en-2-yl)-4′′,5′′-dihydrofuro[2′′,3′′:7,8]rotenan-4-one
- Systematic IUPAC name (2R,6aS,12aS)-8,9-Dimethoxy-2-(prop-1-en-2-yl)-1,2,12,12a-tetrahydro[1]benzopyrano[3,4-b]furo[2,3-h][1]benzopyran-6(6aH)-one
- Other names Tubatoxin, Paraderil, nicouline

Identifiers
| CAS Number | 83-79-4 |
| 3D model (JSmol) | Interactive image |
| ChEBI | CHEBI:28201 |
| ChEMBL | ChEMBL429023 |
| ChemSpider | 6500 |
| ECHA InfoCard | 100.001.365 |
| KEGG | C07593 |
| MeSH | Rotenone |
| PubChem CID | 6758 |
| UNII | 03L9OT429T |
| CompTox Dashboard (EPA) | DTXSID6021248 |
- InChI: InChI=1/C23H22O6/c1-11(2)16-8-14-15(28-16)6-5-12-22(24)21-13-7-18(25-3)19(26-4)9-17(13)27-10-20(21)29-23(12)14/h5-7,9,16,20-21H,1,8,10H2,2-4H3/t16-,20-,21+/m1/s1
- SMILES: CC(=C)[C@H]1Cc2c(O1)ccc3c2O[C@@H]4COc5cc(OC)c(OC)cc5[C@@H]4C3=O

Properties
| Chemical formula | C_{23}H_{22}O_{6} |
| Molar mass | 394.423 g·mol^{−1} |
| Appearance | Colorless to red crystalline solid |
| Odor | Odorless |
| Density | 1.27 g/cm^{3} @ 20 °C |
| Melting point | 165 to 166 °C (329 to 331 °F; 438 to 439 K) |
| Boiling point | 210 to 220 °C (410 to 428 °F; 483 to 493 K) at 0.5 mmHg |
| Solubility | Soluble in ether and acetone, slightly soluble in ethanol |
| Vapor pressure | <0.00004 mmHg (20 °C) |

Hazards
- Lethal dose or concentration (LD, LC)
| LD_{50} (median dose) | 25–132 mg/kg (oral, rat); 2.8 mg/kg (oral, mouse) |
- NIOSH (US health exposure limits)
| PEL (Permissible) | TWA 5 mg/m^{3} |
| REL (Recommended) | TWA 5 mg/m^{3} |
| IDLH (Immediate danger) | 2500 mg/m^{3} |
- Except where otherwise noted, data are given for materials in their standard state (at 25 °C [77 °F], 100 kPa). verify (what is ?) Infobox references

Rotenone is an organic compound that has been described as "by far the most important rotenoid." It is an odorless, colorless, crystalline isoflavone. It occurs naturally in the seeds and stems of several plants, such as the jicama vine, and in the roots of several other members of the Fabaceae. It was the first-described member of the family of chemical compounds known as rotenoids. Rotenone is approved for use as a piscicide to remove alien fish species, see Uses. It has also been used as a broad-spectrum insecticide, but its use as an insecticide has been banned in many countries.

== Discovery ==
The earliest written record of the now-known rotenone-containing plants used for killing leaf-eating caterpillars was in 1848; for centuries, these same plants had been used to poison fish. The active chemical component was first isolated in 1895 by a French botanist, Emmanuel Geoffroy, who called it nicouline, from a specimen of Robinia nicou, now called Deguelia utilis, while traveling in French Guiana. He wrote about this research in his thesis, published in 1895 after his death from a parasitic disease. In 1902 Kazuo Nagai, Japanese chemical engineer of the Government-General of Taiwan, isolated a pure crystalline compound from Derris elliptica which he called rotenone, after the Taiwanese name of the plant 蘆藤 (Min Nan Chinese: lôo-tîn) translated into Japanese rōten (ローテン). By 1930, nicouline and rotenone were established to be chemically the same.

== Uses ==
=== Use as piscicide in fisheries management ===
Rotenone is used as a nonselective piscicide (fish killer). Rotenone has historically been used by Indigenous peoples to catch fish. Typically, rotenone-containing plants in the legume family, Fabaceae, are crushed and introduced into a body of water, and as rotenone interferes with cellular respiration, the affected fish rise to the surface, where they are more easily caught.

In modern times it is frequently used as a tool to remove alien fish species, as it has a relatively short half-life (days) and is gone from rivers in the course of days and from lakes within a few months, depending on (seasonal) stirring, organic content, availability of sunlight and temperature. Rotenone has been used by government agencies to kill fish in rivers and lakes in the United States since 1952, and in Canada and Norway since the 1980s. It is less frequently used in EU countries, due to strict regulations, but has seen some use in selected countries such as the UK (Topmouth gudgeon), Sweden (Pike, marsh frog, goldfish and pumpkinseed), Spain (Topmouth gudgeon, Gambusia) and Hungary (Prussian carp).

Rotenone has also seen some use in other field studies in the marine environment needing only small quantities. Small-scale sampling with rotenone is used by fish researchers studying the biodiversity of marine fishes to collect cryptic, or hidden, fishes, which represent an important component of shoreline fish communities, since it has only minor, local and transient environmental side effects.

==== Rotenone degradation and ecosystem impact ====
Rotenone primarily affects gilled organisms such as fish and aquatic invertebrates. Terrestrial animals such as birds, mammals, and amphibians (except tadpoles/larvae) are much less affected by rotenone. When applied in freshwater systems, the treatment dose kills the target fish and usually other gilled species like tadpoles and zooplankton are affected, depending on dosage. However, timing treatments in the fall or winter, when many species are less active, can reduce these impacts. Some taxa may also recover through natural life cycles, such as resting eggs. Its use is more benign for the environment (as compared to drying ponds, or using other piscicides), and studies show that most ecosystems naturally recover within one or two years after rotenone application- with aquatic invertebrates repopulating affected areas, thus restoring initial local biodiversity to its status prior to the introduction of the invasive species.

Rotenone decays through metabolites and its final product is reduced to water and carbon dioxide. It oxidizes to rotenolone, which is about an order of magnitude less toxic than rotenone. In water, the rate of decomposition depends upon several factors, including temperature, pH, water hardness and sunlight. The half-life of rotenone in a pond of 1.1 mean depth ranged from half a day at 24 °C to 3.5 days at 0 °C, but in deeper oligotrophic systems (thus less degradation due to sunlight and organic content) the half-life may be considerably longer.

==== Notable administrations as piscicide ====
Norwegian authorities have been using rotenone since the mid-1980s to eradicate the salmon fluke Gyrodactylus salaris, and as of 2024 52 out of 54 affected river catchments have been treated. Additionally, in about 30 occasions lakes and ponds have been rotenone treated in an effort to remove national or regional invasive species, such as northern pike, roach, minnow, crucian carp, tench and perch.

In 1992, Florida Fish and Wildlife Conservation Commission (FWC) officials used rotenone to eradicate an established population of invasive jaguar cichlids from a small pond in Miami-Dade County. Officials were successful in killing every jaguar cichlid (along with every other fish) in the pond, but unsuccessful in eradicating them from Florida; the cichlids had already spread throughout the Miami Canal and its connected waterways, and by 1994, jaguar cichlids had successfully established themselves throughout Southern and Central Florida.

In September 2010, Oregon Department of Fish and Wildlife officials used rotenone to kill an established population of invasive goldfish present in eastern Oregon's Mann Lake, with the intention of not disrupting the lake's native Lahontan cutthroat trout population. Rotenone successfully achieved these aims, killing between 179,000 and 197,000 goldfish and fathead minnows, and only three trout.

Beginning May 1, 2006, Panguitch Lake, a reservoir in the southeastern portion of the U.S. state of Utah, was treated with rotenone, to potentially eradicate and control the invasive population of Utah chub, which were probably introduced accidentally by anglers who used them as live bait. The lake was restocked with 20,000 rainbow trout in 2006; as of 2016, the lake's fish population has recovered.

In 2012, rotenone was used to kill all remaining fish in Stormy Lake (Alaska) due to invasive pike destroying native species, which were reintroduced once the treatment was concluded.

In 2014, rotenone was used to kill all remaining fish in San Francisco's Mountain Lake, which is located in Mountain Lake Park, in order to rid it of invasive species introduced since the migration of European settlers to the region.

In 2023 and 2025, Sweden used rotenone to eradicate pumpkinseed, grass carp, marsh frog and goldfish.

==== Deactivation ====
Rotenone can be deactivated in water with the use of potassium permanganate to lower toxicity to acceptable levels.

=== Use as insecticide ===
Rotenone was commercialized as cubé, tuba, or derris, in single preparation or in synergistic combination with other insecticides. It has high acute toxicity to mammals, and all insecticidal uses were banned in the United States and Canada, in the EU, in the UK, and in Switzerland. It remains legal as a pesticide in a number of other countries, including Australia and New Zealand; the status and effective date of ban in select countries is provided in the table below.

Legal status of rotenone as a pesticide, by country
| Country | Status | Ban effective |
|---|---|---|
| Australia | legal | - |
| Canada | banned | 31 December 2012 |
| EU | banned | 10 October 2008 |
| New Zealand | legal | - |
| Switzerland | banned | 1 January 2014 |
| United Kingdom | banned | 10 October 2008 |
| United States | banned | 23 March 2011 (EPA); 28 January 2019 (USDA) |

Rotenone was used in powdered form to treat scabies and head lice on humans, and parasitic mites on chickens, livestock, and pet animals.

In agriculture it was unselective in action and killed potato beetles, cucumber beetles, flea beetles, cabbage worms, raspberry beetles, and asparagus beetles, as well as most other arthropods. It biodegrades rapidly in soil, with 90% degraded after 1–3 months at 20 °C (68 °F) and three times faster at 30 °C (86 °F). The compound decomposes when exposed to sunlight and usually has an activity of six days in the environment.

== Mechanism of action ==
Rotenone works by interfering with the electron transport chain within complex I in mitochondria, which places it in IRAC MoA class 21 (by itself in 21B). It inhibits the transfer of electrons from iron-sulfur centers in complex I to ubiquinone. This interferes with NADH during the creation of usable cellular energy (ATP). Complex I is unable to pass off its electron to CoQ, creating a back-up of electrons within the mitochondrial matrix. Cellular oxygen is reduced to the radical, creating reactive oxygen species, which can damage DNA and other components of the mitochondria.

Rotenone is used in biomedical research to study the oxygen consumption rate of cells, usually in combination with antimycin A (an electron transport chain Complex III inhibitor), oligomycin (an ATP synthase inhibitor) and FCCP (a mitochondrial uncoupler).

Rotenone also inhibits microtubule assembly.

== Presence in plants ==
Rotenone is produced by extraction from the roots and stems of several tropical and subtropical plant species, especially those belonging to the genera Lonchocarpus and Derris.

Some of the plants containing rotenone:

- Hoary pea or goat's rue (Tephrosia virginiana) – North America
- Jícama (Pachyrhizus erosus) – North America
- Cubé plant or lancepod (Lonchocarpus utilis) – South America
  - The root extract is referred to as cubé resin
- Barbasco (Lonchocarpus urucu) – South America
  - The root extract is referred to as cubé resin
- Tuba plant (Derris elliptica) – southeast Asia and southwest Pacific islands
  - The root extract is referred to as derris or derris root
- Jewel vine (Derris involuta) – southeast Asia and southwest Pacific islands
  - The root extract is referred to as derris or derris root
- Common Mullein (Verbascum thapsus L.)
- Cork-bush (Mundulea sericea) – southern Africa
- Florida fishpoison tree (Piscidia piscipula) – southern Florida, Caribbean
- Several species of Millettia and Tephrosia in South-east Asian regions

== Mammalian toxicity ==
Rotenone is classified by the World Health Organization as moderately hazardous. It is mildly toxic to humans and other mammals, but extremely toxic to insects and aquatic life, including fish. This higher toxicity in fish and insects is because the lipophilic rotenone is easily taken up through the gills or trachea, but not as easily through the skin or the gastrointestinal tract. Rotenone is toxic to erythrocytes in vitro.

The lowest lethal dose for a child is not known, but death occurred in a 3.5-year-old child who had ingested 40 mg/kg rotenone solution. Human deaths from rotenone poisoning are rare because its irritating action causes vomiting. Deliberate ingestion of rotenone can be fatal.

A 2018 study, which examined the effects of rotenone administration on cell cultures that mimicked properties of developing brains, found that rotenone may be a developmental neurotoxicant; that is, that rotenone exposure in the developing fetus may impede proper human brain development, with potentially profound consequences later in life. The study found that rotenone was particularly damaging to dopaminergic neurons, consistent with prior findings.

=== Parkinson's disease ===
In 2000, injecting rotenone into rats was reported to cause the development of symptoms similar to those of Parkinson's disease (PD). Rotenone was continuously applied over a period of five weeks, mixed with DMSO and PEG to enhance tissue penetration, and injected into the jugular vein. The study does not directly suggest rotenone exposure is responsible for PD in humans, but is consistent with the belief that chronic exposure to environmental toxins increases the likelihood of the disease. In 2011, a US National Institutes of Health study showed a link between rotenone use and Parkinson's disease in farm workers, suggesting a link between neural damage and pulmonary uptake by not using protective gear. Exposure to the chemical in the field can be avoided by wearing a gas mask with filter, which is standard HSE procedure in modern application of the chemical.

Studies with primary cultures of rat neurons and microglia have shown low doses of rotenone (below 10 nM) induce oxidative damage and death of dopaminergic neurons, and it is these neurons in the substantia nigra that die in Parkinson's disease. Another study has also described toxic action of rotenone at low concentrations (5 nM) in dopaminergic neurons from acute rat brain slices. This toxicity was exacerbated by an additional cell stressor – elevated intracellular calcium concentration – adding support to the 'multiple hit hypothesis' of dopaminergic neuron death.

The neurotoxin MPTP had been known earlier to cause PD-like symptoms (in humans and other primates, though not in rats) by interfering with complex I in the electron transport chain and killing dopaminergic neurons in the substantia nigra. Further studies involving MPTP have failed to show development of Lewy bodies, a key component to PD pathology. However at least one study recently has found evidence of protein aggregation of the same chemical makeup as that which makes up Lewy bodies with similar pathology to Parkinson's disease in aged rhesus monkeys from MPTP. Therefore, the mechanism behind MPTP as it relates to Parkinson's disease is not fully understood. Because of these developments, rotenone was investigated as a possible Parkinson-causing agent. Both MPTP and rotenone are lipophilic and can cross the blood–brain barrier.

In 2010, a study was published detailing the progression of Parkinson's-like symptoms in mice following chronic intragastric ingestion of low doses of rotenone. The concentrations in the central nervous system were below detectable limits, yet still induced PD pathology.

== See also ==
- NADH dehydrogenase
