= C23H22O6 =

The molecular formula C_{23}H_{22}O_{6} (molar mass: 394.42 g/mol, exact mass: 394.1416 u) may refer to:

- Barbigerone
- Deguelin
- Macluraxanthone
- Rotenone
