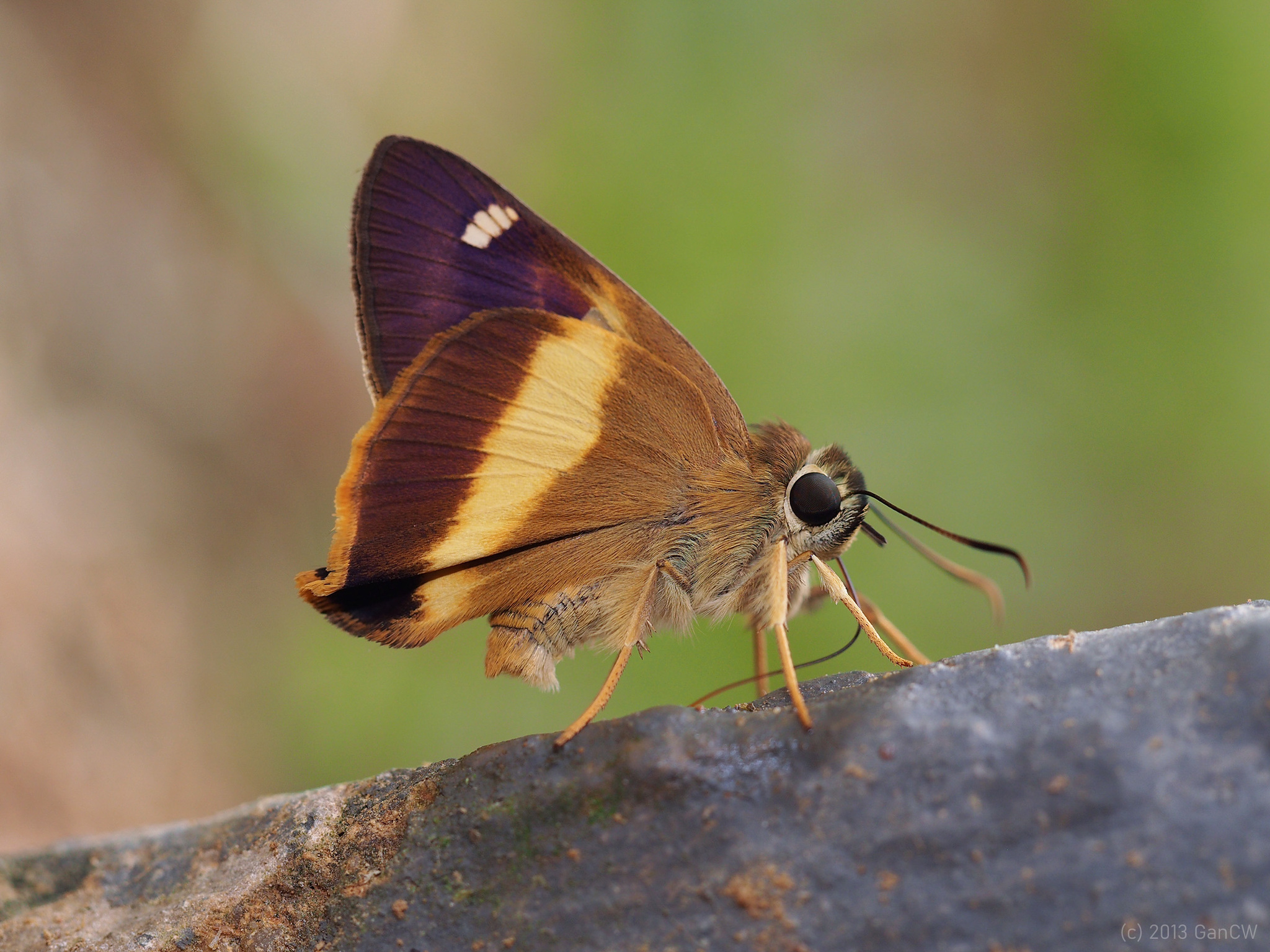

Scientific classification
- Kingdom: Animalia
- Phylum: Arthropoda
- Clade: Pancrustacea
- Class: Insecta
- Order: Lepidoptera
- Family: Hesperiidae
- Genus: Hasora
- Species: H. schoenherr

Binomial name
- Hasora schoenherr (Latreille, 1824)

= Hasora schoenherr =

Yellow banded awl

Species of butterfly

Hasora schoenherr, commonly known as the yellow banded awl, is a butterfly belonging to the family Hesperiidae which is found in India and Southeast Asia.

== Range ==
The yellow banded awl is found in India from Assam and Nagaland eastwards to Southeast Asia, namely, Thailand, Laos, Vietnam, the Malay Peninsula, Singapore and the Indonesian archipelago (specifically recorded at Borneo, Sumatra and Palawan). The type locality is Java.

== Description ==
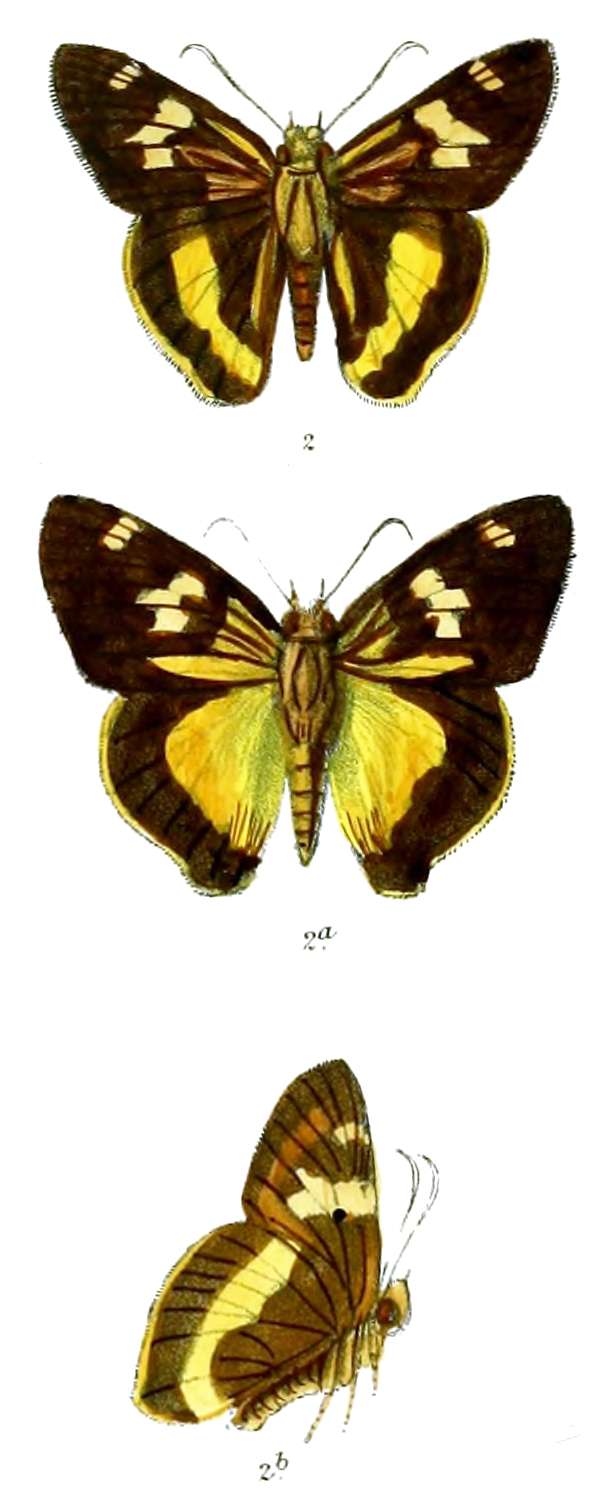
From top - male, female, male underside (chuza)

The butterfly has a wingspan of 45–55 millimetres (1.8–2.2 in) in the Asian mainland while it achieves 50–60 mm (2.0–2.4 in) in the Philippines.

The butterfly is a plain dark brown above and resembles the common banded awl (Hasora chromus), except that it has a broad yellow central band on the upper and under of the hindwings. The apex of the under forewing is purple washed. Both sexes have large yellow discal and apical spots.
