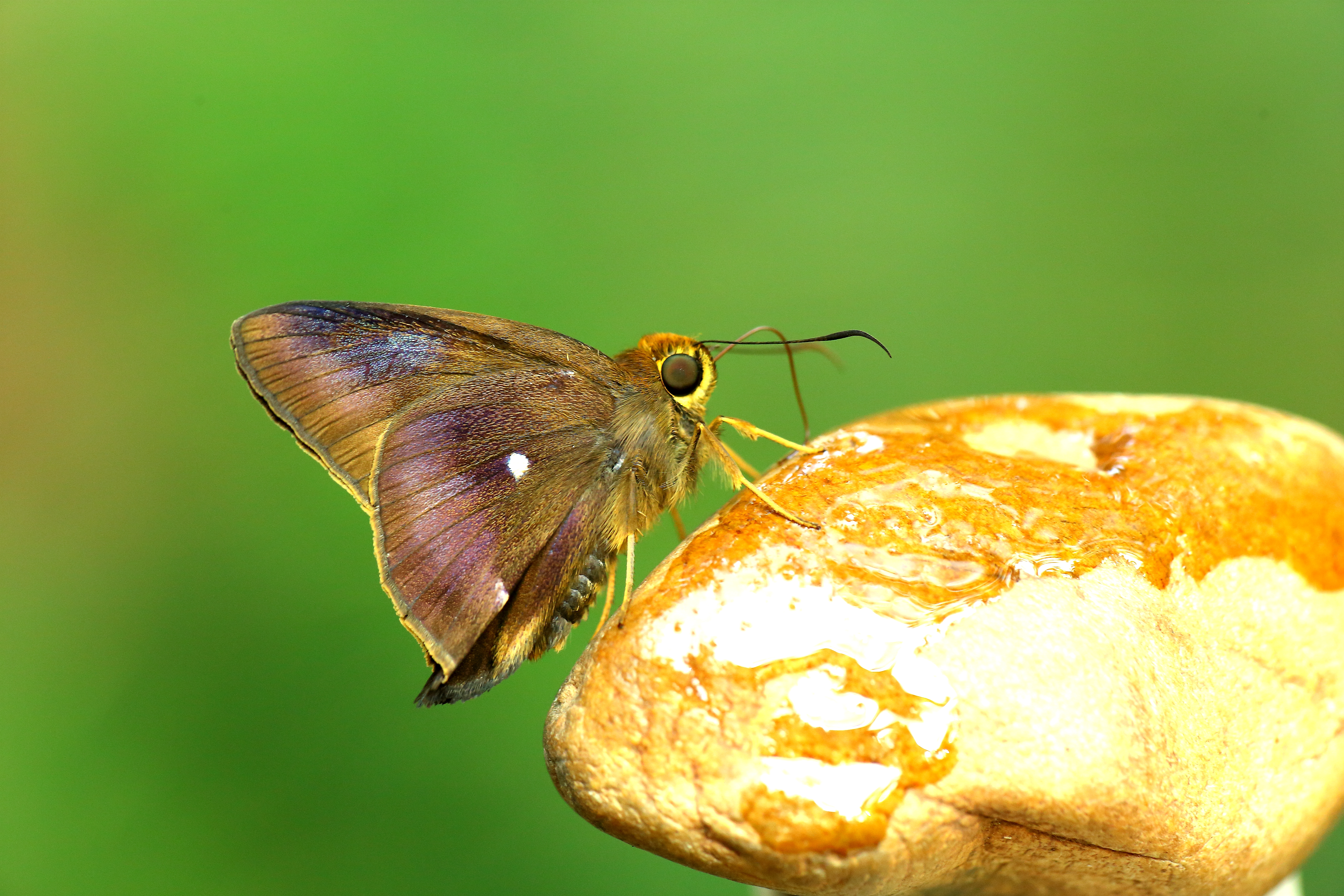

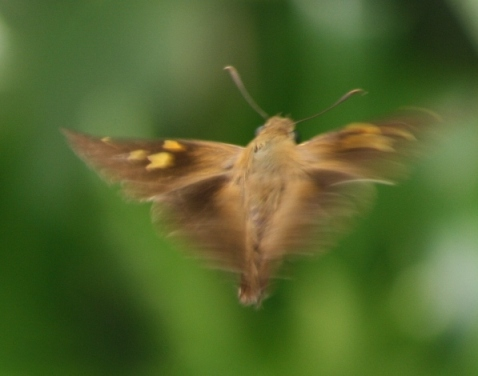

Scientific classification
- Kingdom: Animalia
- Phylum: Arthropoda
- Class: Insecta
- Order: Lepidoptera
- Family: Hesperiidae
- Genus: Hasora
- Species: H. badra

Binomial name
- Hasora badra (Moore, 1857)

= Hasora badra =

Common awl

Species of butterfly

Hasora badra, the common awl, is a butterfly belonging to the family Hesperiidae, which is found in Southeast Asia.

== Description ==
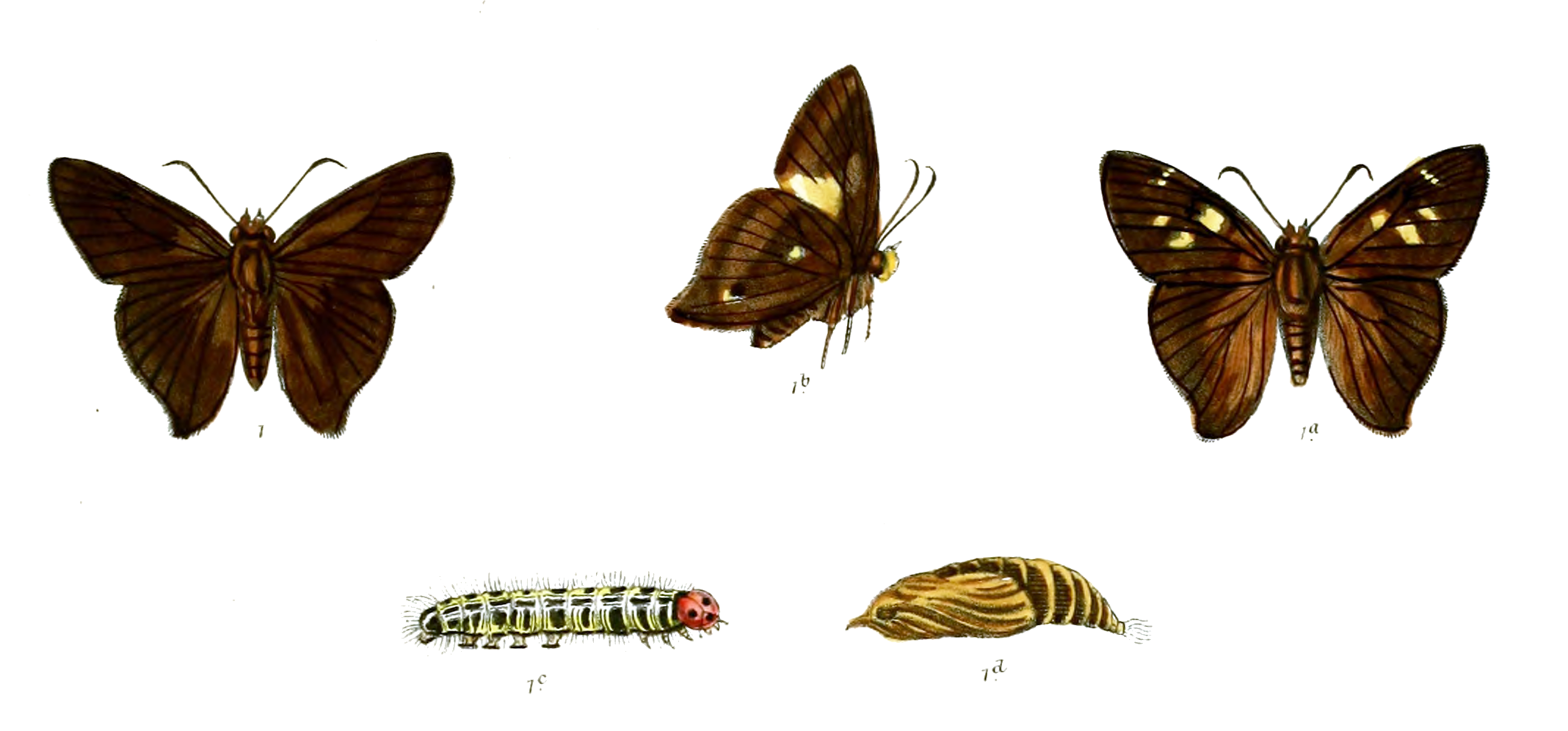

The butterfly, which has a wingspan of 50 to 55 mm, is unmarked dark brown above. It resembles the common banded awl (Hasora chromus), except that it has no white band below; and the apex of the forewing and the disc of the hindwing below are purple washed. The male has apical spots but no brands above. The female has large yellow spots in cell 2 and 3, and apical dots.

The Sri Lankan race has no apical spots on the male above and no purple wash below.

=== Detailed description ===
Edward Yerbury Watson (1891) gives a detailed description, shown below:

Male and female yellowish brown.

Male, with a suffused blackish subbasal patch; forewing with three conjugated very small yellowish semitransparent spots near the costa, one fourth from the apex. Cilia pale greyish brown. Underside brown suffused with purple; forewing with a blackish costal patch before the apex, posterior margin yellowish; hindwing with a subbasal and submarginal suffused blackish band, the latter terminating in a black patch on anal lobe; above the patch is a purple-white streak, and within the cell a small bluish white spot. Palpi and body beneath dull yellow. Legs, pale brown.

Female, above brown suffused with vinaceous yellowish brown basally; forewing with the three small subapical spots (as in male) and three rather large obliquely quadrate spots, two being disposed on the disc, the third above and within the cell. Underside with the spots on forewing as in upperside; hindwing as in male.

== Range ==
The butterfly is found in Sri Lanka, India, Myanmar, Thailand, Laos, Hainan, Taiwan, north Vietnam, Japan, western China, Malaysia, the Indonesian archipelago (Borneo, Sumatra, and Java), the Philippines, Palawan, the Moluccas and Sulawesi.

In India the butterfly is found in South India, where it occurs in the Western Ghats, and the Nilgiris; and in the Himalayas from Mussoorie eastwards to Sikkim and through to Myanmar. It is also found in the Andaman Islands and Nicobar Islands.

The type locality is Java, Indonesia.

== Status ==
William Harry Evans (1932) described it as not rare.

== Host plants ==
The larva has been recorded on Derris trifoliata, Derris elliptica, Millettia pachycarpa and Pongamia species.
