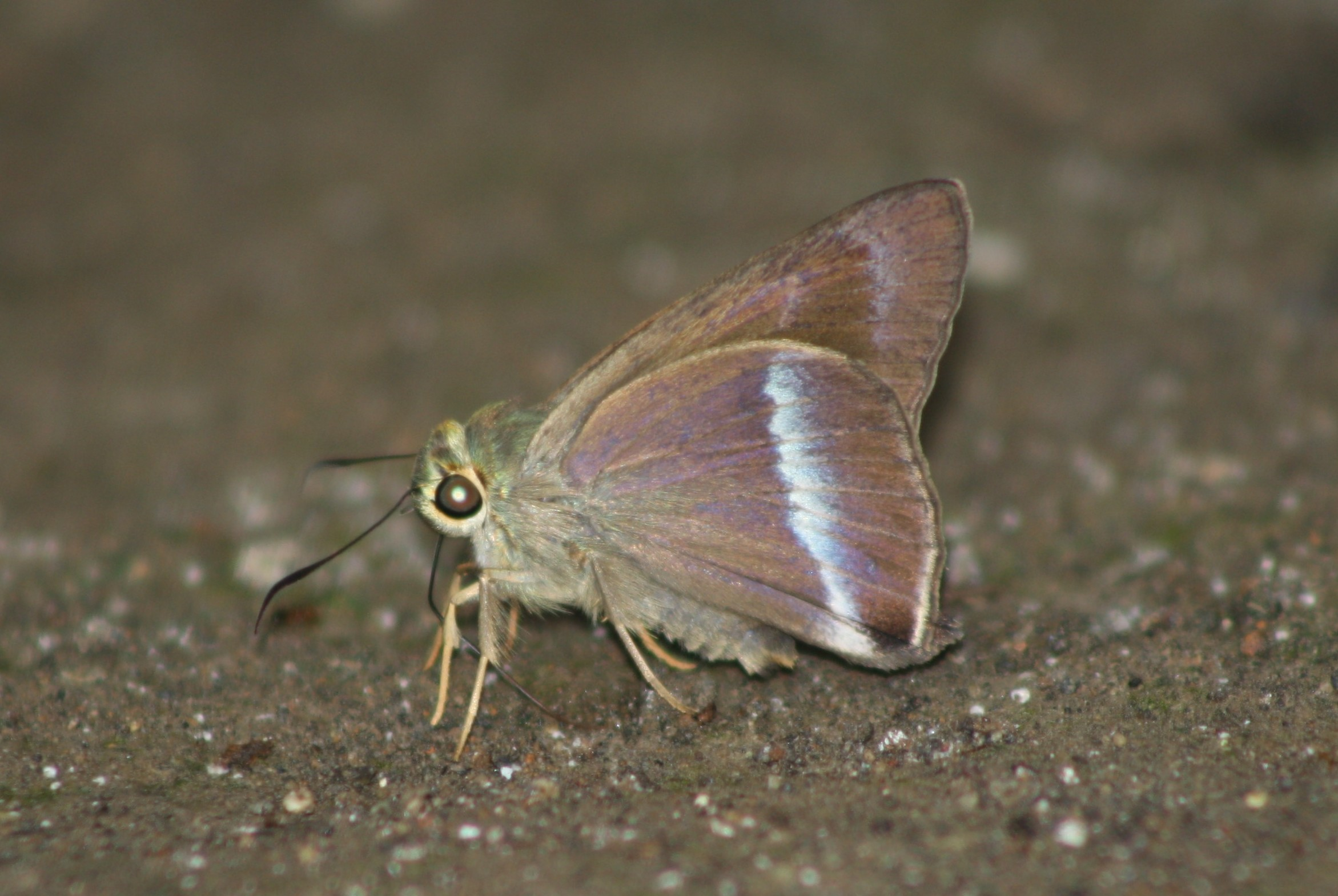

Scientific classification
- Kingdom: Animalia
- Phylum: Arthropoda
- Class: Insecta
- Order: Lepidoptera
- Family: Hesperiidae
- Genus: Hasora
- Species: H. vitta

Binomial name
- Hasora vitta (Butler, 1870)

= Hasora vitta =

Plain banded awl

Species of butterfly

Hasora vitta, the plain banded awl, is a butterfly belonging to the family Hesperiidae which is found in India and parts of Southeast Asia.

== Description ==
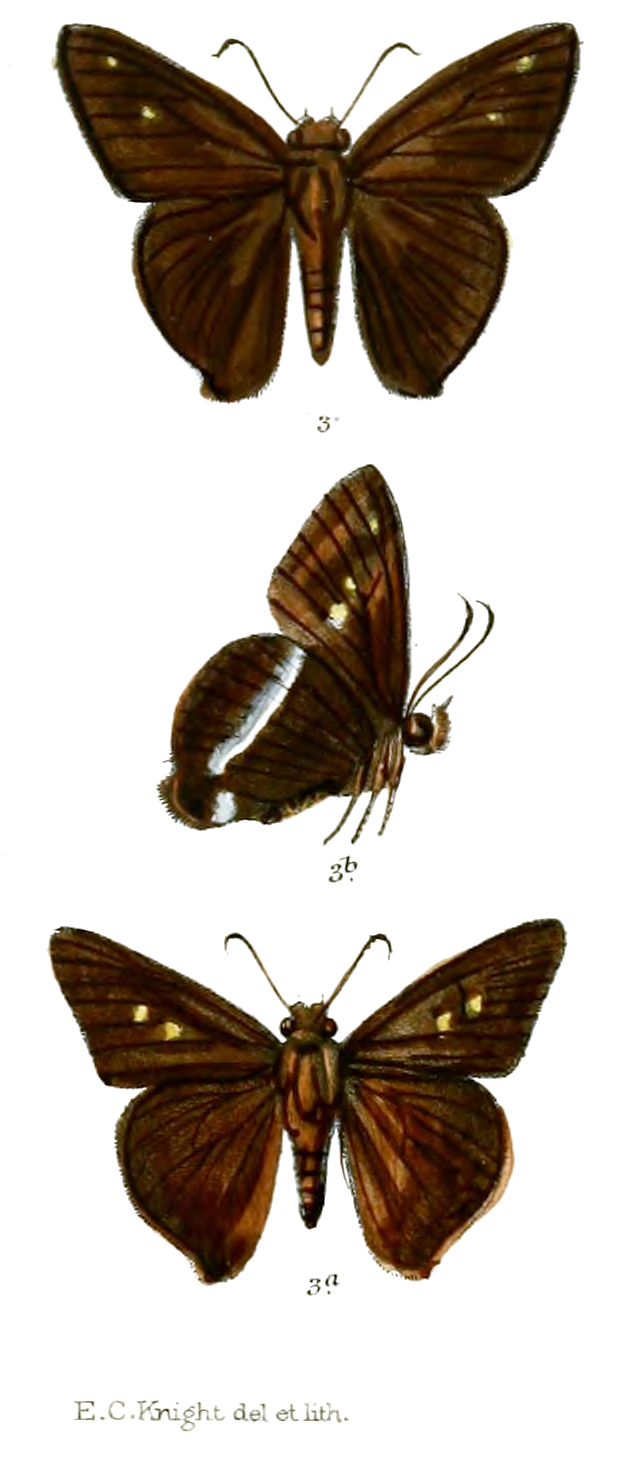

The butterfly, which has a wingspan of 45 to 55 mm, is dark brown above. It resembles the common banded awl (Hasora chromus), except in the case of having a broad white band on the under hindwing which is outwardly diffused; also, its wings are more prominently glossed.

Other differentiating characteristics are:

Male: The upper forewing has an apical spot, sometimes with another in 3. The upper forewing has no brand.

Female: The apical spot in the case of the female is larger, and there is an additional spot in 2.

== Taxonomy ==
The butterfly has two subspecies:

- Hasora vitta vitta - South Myanmar (Dawnas), Malaya peninsula, Indonesian archipelago and Philippines.
- Hasora vitta indica - South India, Sikkim, Assam, North Myanmar, Thailand and south western China.

== Range ==
The plain banded awl is found in India in the south (Kanara), Sikkim, Assam and eastwards to Myanmar, Thailand, western China, Malaysia, Indonesia and the Philippines.

== Status ==
Not rare as per Evans (1932). Not common as per Wynter-Blyth (1957).

== Host-plants ==
The caterpillars have been recorded on Derris spp., Pongamia spp., Millettia extensa, Endosamara racemosa, Millettia glabra and Spatholobus ferrugineus.
