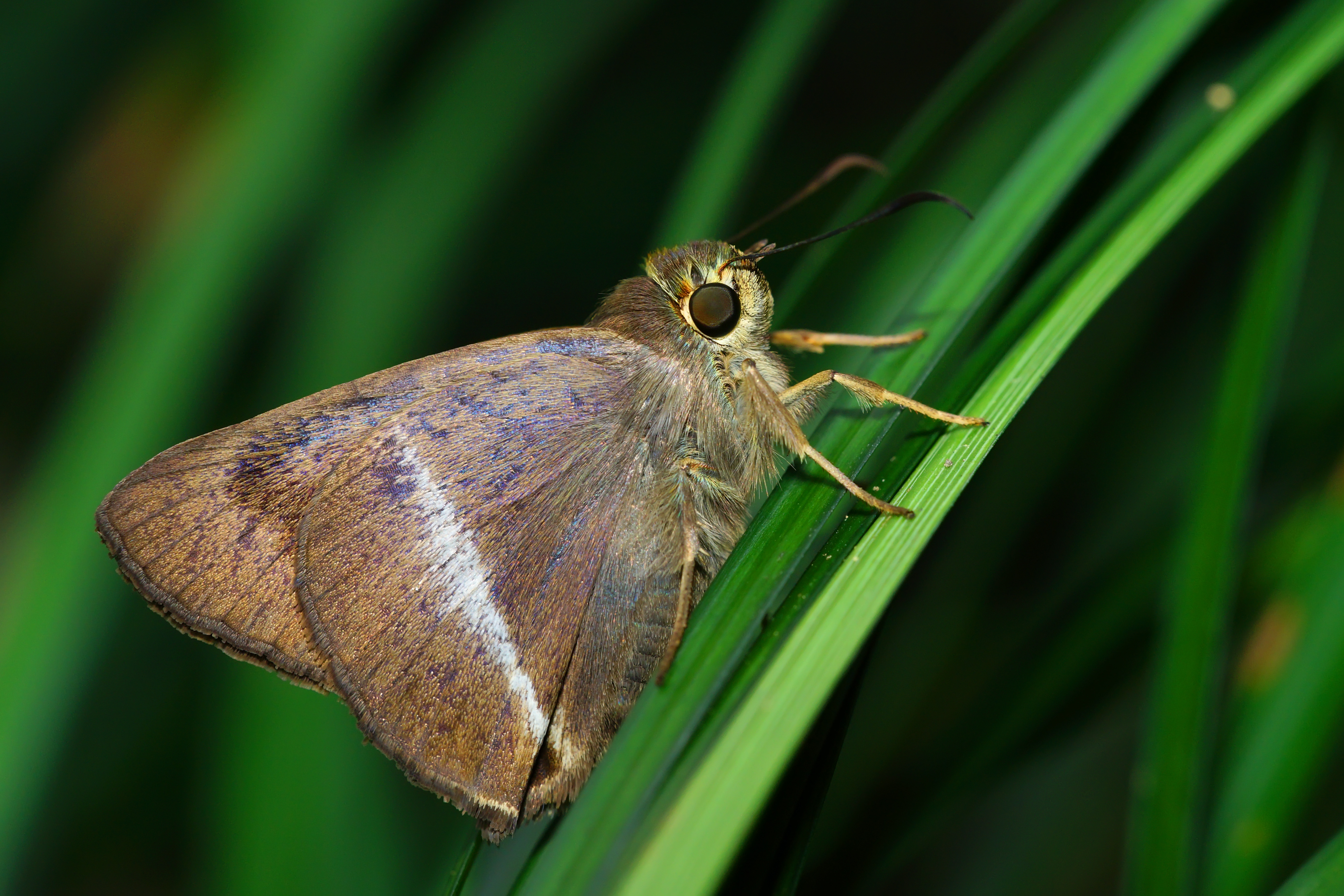
- Hasora taminatus vairacana

Scientific classification
- Kingdom: Animalia
- Phylum: Arthropoda
- Clade: Pancrustacea
- Class: Insecta
- Order: Lepidoptera
- Family: Hesperiidae
- Genus: Hasora
- Species: H. taminatus

Binomial name
- Hasora taminatus (Hübner, 1818)

Synonyms
- Coeliades taminatus Hübner, 1818; Hasora alexis vairacana Fruhstorfer, 1911; Hasora malayana bhavara Fruhstorfer, 1911; Hasora malayana dipama Fruhstorfer, 1911; Hasora malayana padma Fruhstorfer, 1911; Hasora malayana galaca Fruhstorfer, 1911; Ismene malayana C. & R. Felder, 1860; Hasora almea Swinhoe, 1909; Parata canostigma Joicey & Talbot, 1921; Hasora malayana salemana Kalis, 1933; Ismene malayana var. attenuata Staudinger, 1889; Ismene attenuata Mabille, 1904; Hasora meala Swinhoe, 1907; Hasora amboinensis Swinhoe, 1909; Hasora malayana pramidha Fruhstorfer, 1911

= Hasora taminatus =

White banded awl

Species of butterfly

Hasora taminatus, the white banded awl, is a butterfly belonging to the family Hesperiidae, which is found in Asia.

== Range ==
The butterfly is found in Sri Lanka, India, Myanmar, Cambodia Thailand, Laos, Hainan, Hong Kong, western China, Malaysia, the Indonesian archipelago (Borneo, Sumatra, Java, Nias, Sumbawa and Bali), the Philippines and Sulawesi.

In India the butterfly is found in South India, where it occurs in the Western Ghats, Kodagu, Nilgiri mountains and Palni hills; and in the Himalayas from Mussoorie eastwards to Sikkim and through to Myanmar. It is also found in the Andaman Islands and Nicobar Islands.

The type locality is South India.

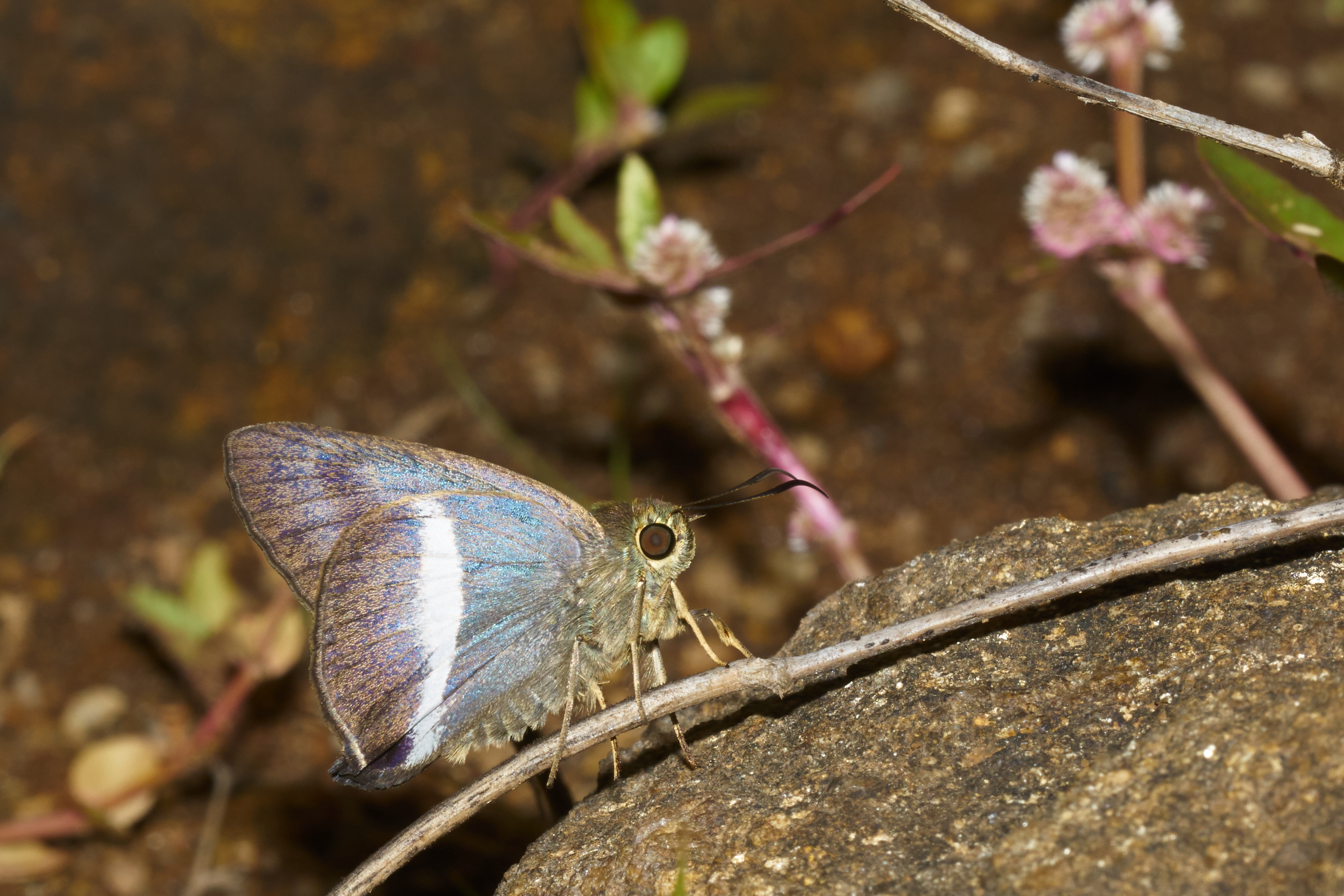
White banded awl at Periyar National Park, Kerala

== Status ==
William Harry Evans (1932) reports that it is common in South India and not rare elsewhere.

== Description ==
The butterfly, which has a wingspan of 45 to 55 mm, is dark brown and unmarked above; and resembles the common banded awl (Hasora chromus), except that it has a broad white band on the under hindwing which is sharply defined. The female white banded awl has small spots on the upper forewing while the male has no brand above.

=== Detailed description ===
Edward Yerbury Watson (1891) gives detailed descriptions of H. t. malayana (C. & R. Felder, 1860), shown below:

Alls supra fuscis, subtus anticarum limbo costali, posticarum dimidio basali chalybaeis, his striga discali alba.

— (Felder, I. c.)

The females have a small semi-transparent yellowish discal speck between the two posterior branches of the median vein, and of course lack the oblique band of short lines of modified scales seen in the males of this as well as of the preceding closely-allied species." (Wood-Mason and de Niceville, J. A. S. B., 1881, p. 254.)

The above refers to Andaman females only, as in the Nicobar females the small semi-transparent yellow discal speck between the two posterior branches of the median vein is wanting according to Messrs. Wood-Mason and de Niceville.

Recorded from the Andamans and Nicobars.

Note: As H. t. malayana is sympatric with another subspecies, H. t. bhavara Fruhstorfer, 1911 in part of its range it has now been given specific status.

== Host plants ==
The larva has been recorded on Derris scandens and Pongamia pinnatta species.

== Subspecies ==
- Hasora taminatus taminatus
- Hasora taminatus vairacana Fruhstorfer, 1911 (Taiwan, Japan)
- Hasora taminatus bhavara Fruhstorfer, 1911 (Sikkim)
- Hasora taminatus padma Fruhstorfer, 1911 (Palawan)
- Hasora taminatus malayana (C. & R. Felder, 1860) (Sikkim to Burma, Thailand, Laos, Hainan, Hong Kong, West China, Malaya, Borneo, Sumatra, Java, Nias, Sumbawa, Bali)
- Hasora taminatus attenuata (Staudinger, 1889) (Sulawesi)
- Hasora taminatus amboinensis Swinhoe, 1909 (New Guinea)
