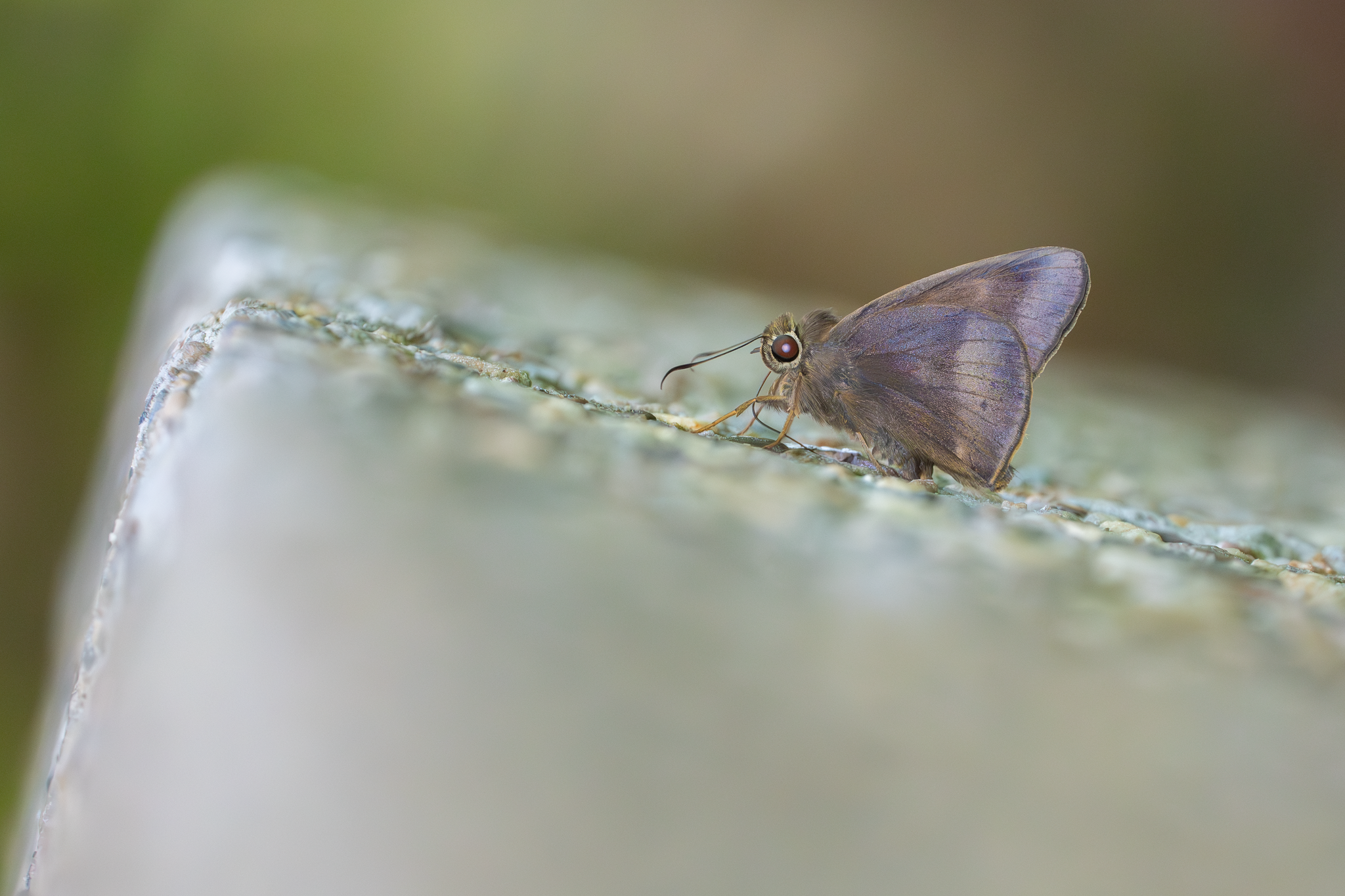

Scientific classification
- Kingdom: Animalia
- Phylum: Arthropoda
- Clade: Pancrustacea
- Class: Insecta
- Order: Lepidoptera
- Family: Hesperiidae
- Subfamily: Coeliadinae
- Genus: Hasora
- Species: H. danda

Binomial name
- Hasora danda Evans, 1949

= Hasora danda =

Species of butterfly

Hasora danda, also known as the purple awl, is a butterfly in the family Hesperiidae. It is found from Manipur in India to Vietnam. It was described by William Harry Evans in 1949. This species is monotypic.

== Description ==
The underside forewing has a costa and apex while the hindwing has a purple glaze. The male of this species is similar to Hasora anura but the dark discal line in underside hindwing is not indented in space 5 and the dots in upperside hindwing and in cell underside hindwing are absent.

Th female is even more similar to Hasora anura, but the underside hindwing cell spot is very small.
