= Sarcolobus pepo =

Scientific classification
- Kingdom: Plantae
- Clade: Tracheophytes
- Clade: Angiosperms
- Clade: Eudicots
- Clade: Asterids
- Order: Gentianales
- Family: Apocynaceae
- Subfamily: Asclepiadoideae
- Tribe: Marsdenieae
- Genus: Sarcolobus
- Species: S. pepo

Binomial name
- Sarcolobus pepo (P.I.Forst.) S.Reuss, Liede & Meve (2022)

Synonyms
- Gunnessia pepo P.I.Forst. (1990)

Genus of flowering plants

Sarcolobus pepo is species of flowering plant in the family Apocynaceae. It is a climber endemic to the State of Queensland in northeastern Australia.

Its elevational range is from near sea level to 100 m. It grows in vine thicket, monsoon forest, and rain forest.

The species was first described as Gunnessia pepo in 1990, and placed in the monotypic genus Gunnessia. In 2022 it was placed in the genus Sarcolobus.
