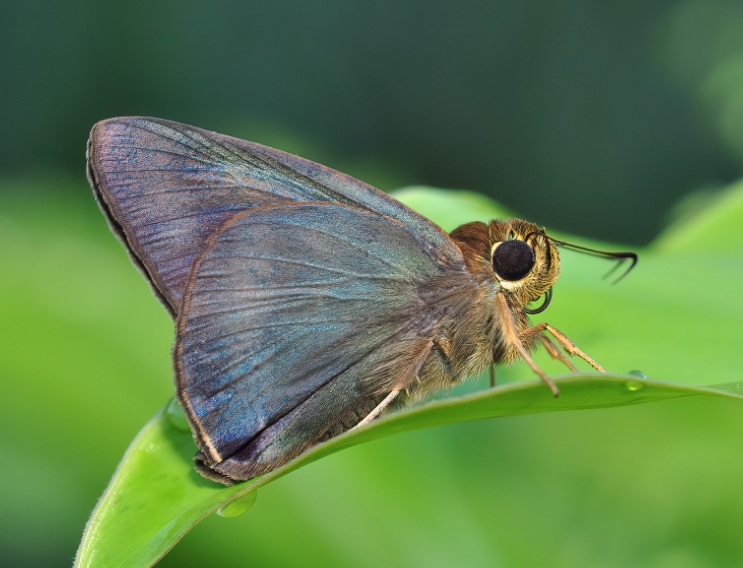

Scientific classification
- Kingdom: Animalia
- Phylum: Arthropoda
- Clade: Pancrustacea
- Class: Insecta
- Order: Lepidoptera
- Family: Hesperiidae
- Genus: Hasora
- Species: H. salanga

Binomial name
- Hasora salanga Plötz, 1885

Synonyms
- Hasora woolletti Riley, 1923

= Hasora salanga =

Green awl

Species of butterfly

Hasora salanga, the green awl, is a butterfly belonging to the family Hesperiidae which is found in India, parts of Southeast Asia and Australia.

== Description ==
The forewing length (base to apex) is 23mm. (male). The underside of the hindwing is green. In females upper forewing has white spots in spaces 2 and 3.

== Distribution ==
The green awl is found in India in the Nicobar Islands and eastwards to Myanmar (Dawnas to south Myanmar), Thailand, the Malay Peninsula (Malacca), Sumatra and Borneo.

== See also ==
- Hesperiidae
- List of butterflies of India (Coeliadinae)
- List of butterflies of India (Hesperiidae)
