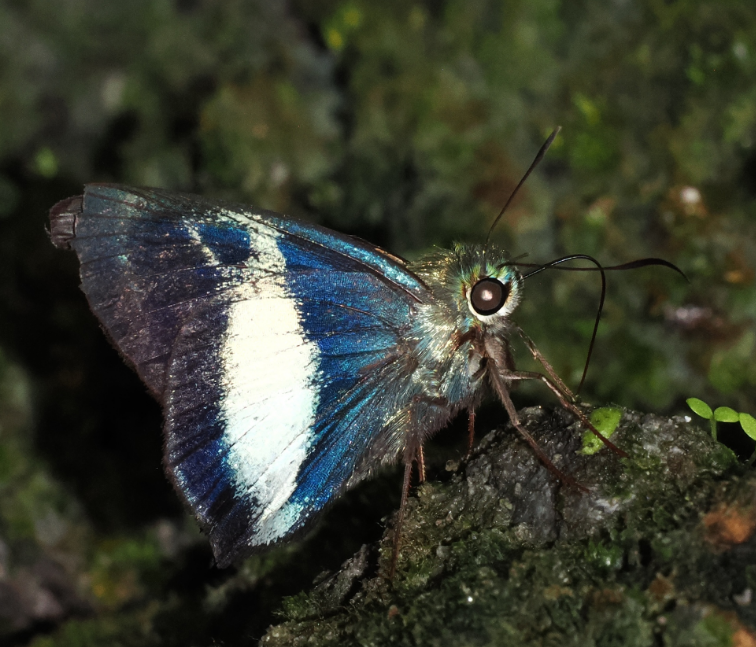

Scientific classification
- Kingdom: Animalia
- Phylum: Arthropoda
- Class: Insecta
- Order: Lepidoptera
- Family: Hesperiidae
- Genus: Hasora
- Species: H. discolor

Binomial name
- Hasora discolor (C. Felder & R. Felder, 1859)

Synonyms
- Goniloba discolor C. & R. Felder, 1859; Hasora mastusia Fruhstorfer, 1911

= Hasora discolor =

Species of butterfly

Hasora discolor, the green awl, is a butterfly of the family Hesperiidae. It is found as several subspecies in Australia (where it is found along the south-eastern coast of New South Wales and the northern Gulf and north-eastern coast of Queensland), the Aru Islands, Irian Jaya, the Kei Islands, Maluku and Papua New Guinea.

The wingspan is about 40 mm.

The larvae feed on Mucuna gigantea and Mucuna novoguineensis.

== Subspecies ==
- Hasora discolor discolor
- Hasora discolor mastusia Fruhstorfer, 1911 (Queensland, Aru Islands, Irian Jaya, Kei Islands, Papua New Guinea)
