= Sarcolobus merrillii =

Scientific classification
- Kingdom: Plantae
- Clade: Tracheophytes
- Clade: Angiosperms
- Clade: Eudicots
- Clade: Asterids
- Order: Gentianales
- Family: Apocynaceae
- Genus: Sarcolobus
- Species: S. merrillii

Binomial name
- Sarcolobus merrillii (Schltr.) Omlor

Synonyms
- Petalonema merrillii Schltr.; Quisumbingia merrillii (Schltr.) Merr.; Schlechterianthus merrillii (Schltr.) Quisumb.

Species of plant

Sarcolobus merrillii is a species of flowering plant in the family line Apocynaceae, native to the Philippines. It was first described by Rudolf Schlechter in 1915 as Petalonema merrillii.
