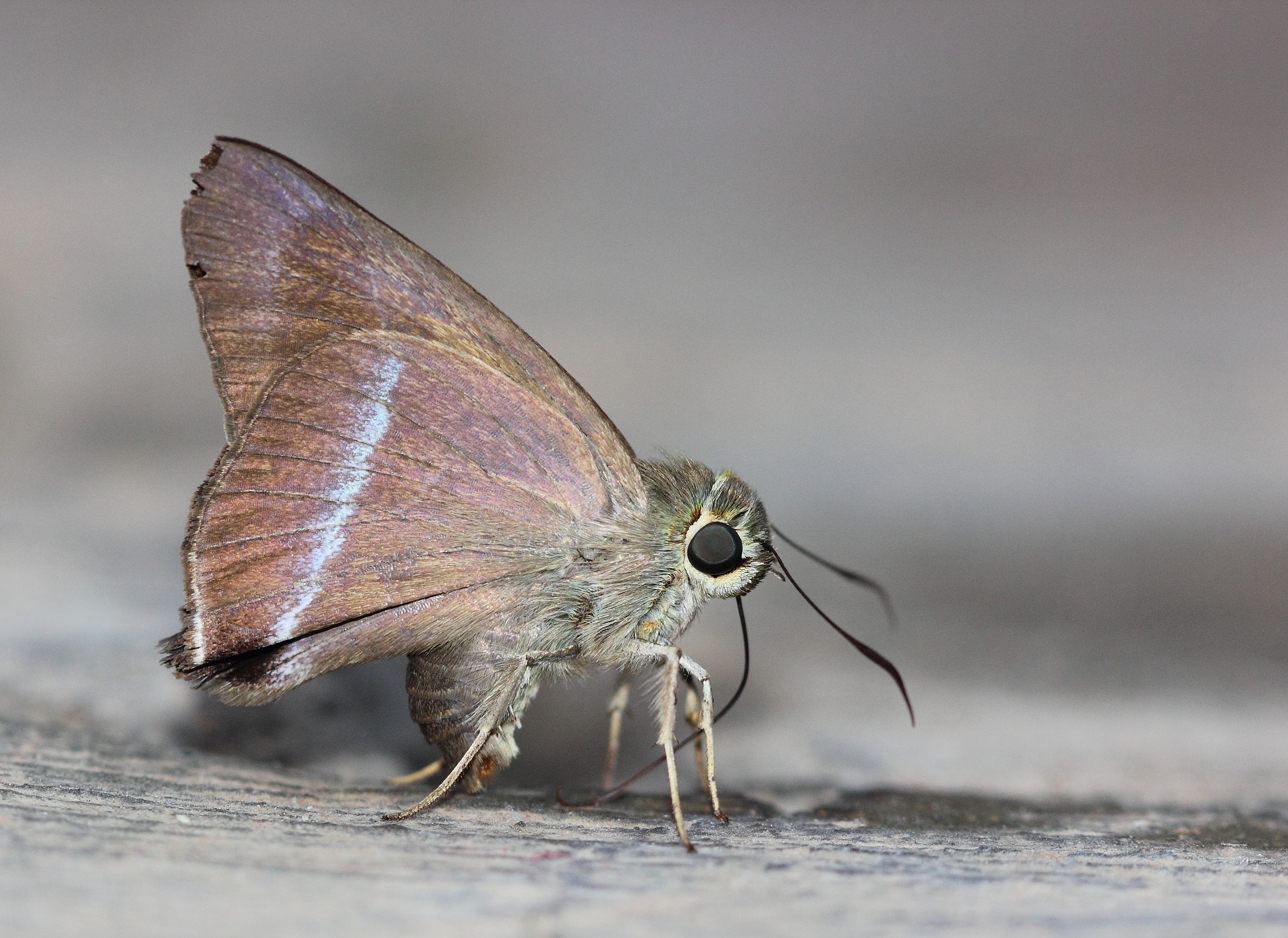

Scientific classification
- Kingdom: Animalia
- Phylum: Arthropoda
- Class: Insecta
- Order: Lepidoptera
- Family: Hesperiidae
- Genus: Hasora
- Species: H. chromus

Binomial name
- Hasora chromus (Cramer, 1782)

Synonyms
- Parata chromus Goniloba chromus Hasora alexis

= Hasora chromus =

Common banded awl

Species of butterfly

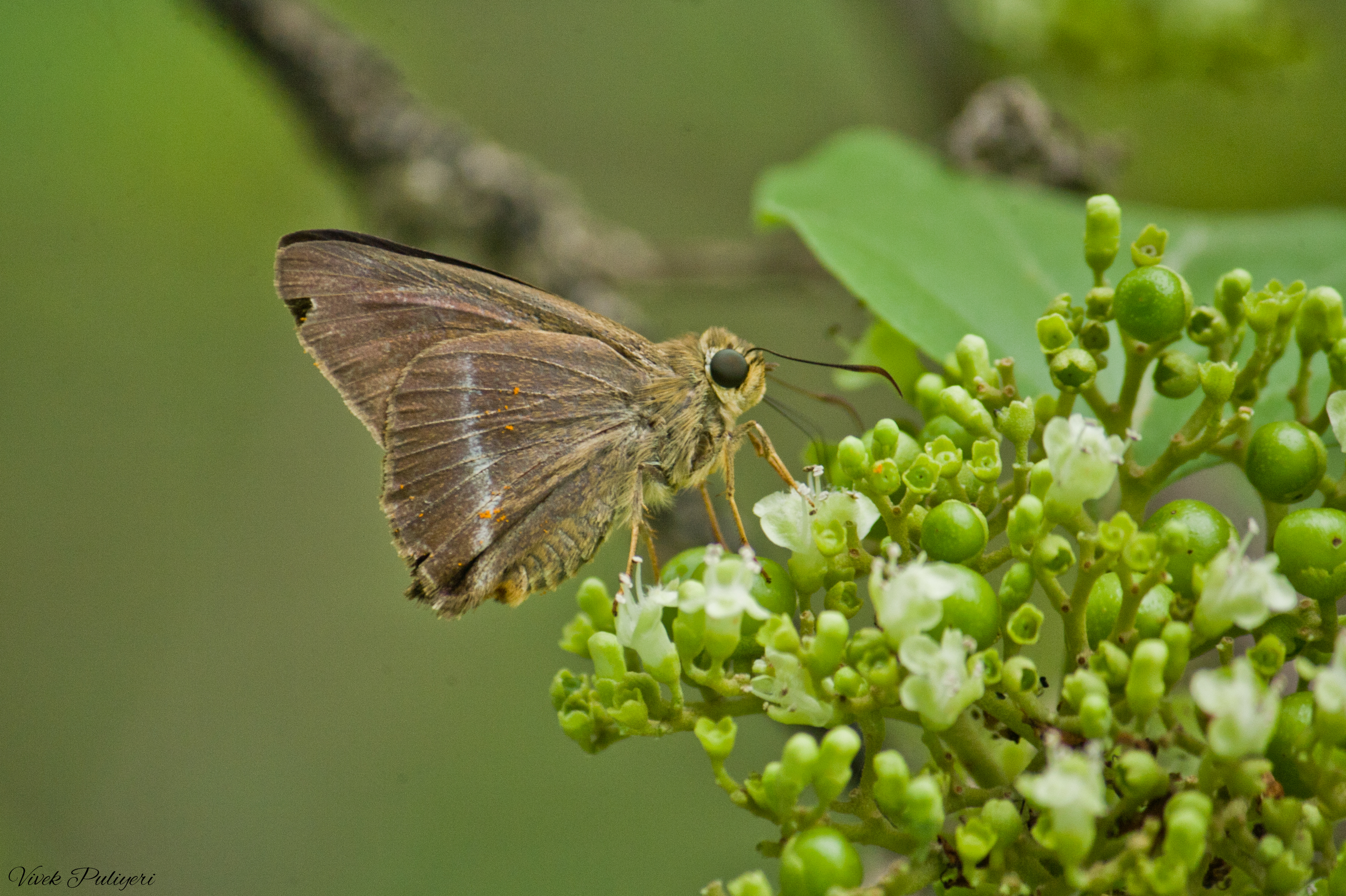
Common banded awl

Hasora chromus, the common banded awl, is a butterfly belonging to the family Hesperiidae which is found in the Indian subcontinent, Southeast Asia and Australia.

== Range ==
The common banded awl is found throughout the Indian subcontinent, Southeast Asia (including the Malay Peninsula and the Indonesian archipelago), South China, Okinawa, Japan, United Arab Emirates, Papua New Guinea and Australia.

It occurs in the plains and hills up to 7,000 feet (2,100 m). It is found in jungle and open country in areas of light and heavy rainfall.

== Description ==
- Both sexes:
  - Wingspan 45–50 mm.
  - The male and female are dark vinaceous (colour of red wine) brown. The cilia is greyish brown while the head and thorax are greenish brown. The abdomen, third joint of palpi and the legs are also brown; the palpi and thorax beneath are dull yellow.
  - Below, the hindwing is dark brown with more of less of dull blue-greyish gloss. It has a narrow discal band, whitish in colour which is diffused on the outside margin. It has a black tornal patch. This black spot is clearly visible only at the time of hatching for a few moments but is becomes hidden in the fold of the hindwing, a characteristic of this genus which develops very soon after. It can also be seen in mounted museum specimens.
- Male: Above, dark brown and unmarked. The upperside of the forewing with a brand from vein 1 to 4.
- Female: Above, the female has two yellowish-white discal spots, with a small spot near the apex.

=== Similar species ===
The following species of awls (genus Hasora) look similar and can be told apart by the differences in the white discal band of the underside of the hindwing.

- Common awl (Hasora badra) (Moore, 1857) – It resembles the common banded awl but lacks the white band. It has rust colouring and a white spot on the underside of the hindwing.
- Plain banded awl (Hasora vitta) (Butler, 1870) – The white band is broader, diffused at the outer margin and has more glossy sheen than the common banded awl.
- White banded awl (Hasora taminatus) (Hübner, 1818) – The white band is broad, sharply defined and generally uniform in width.
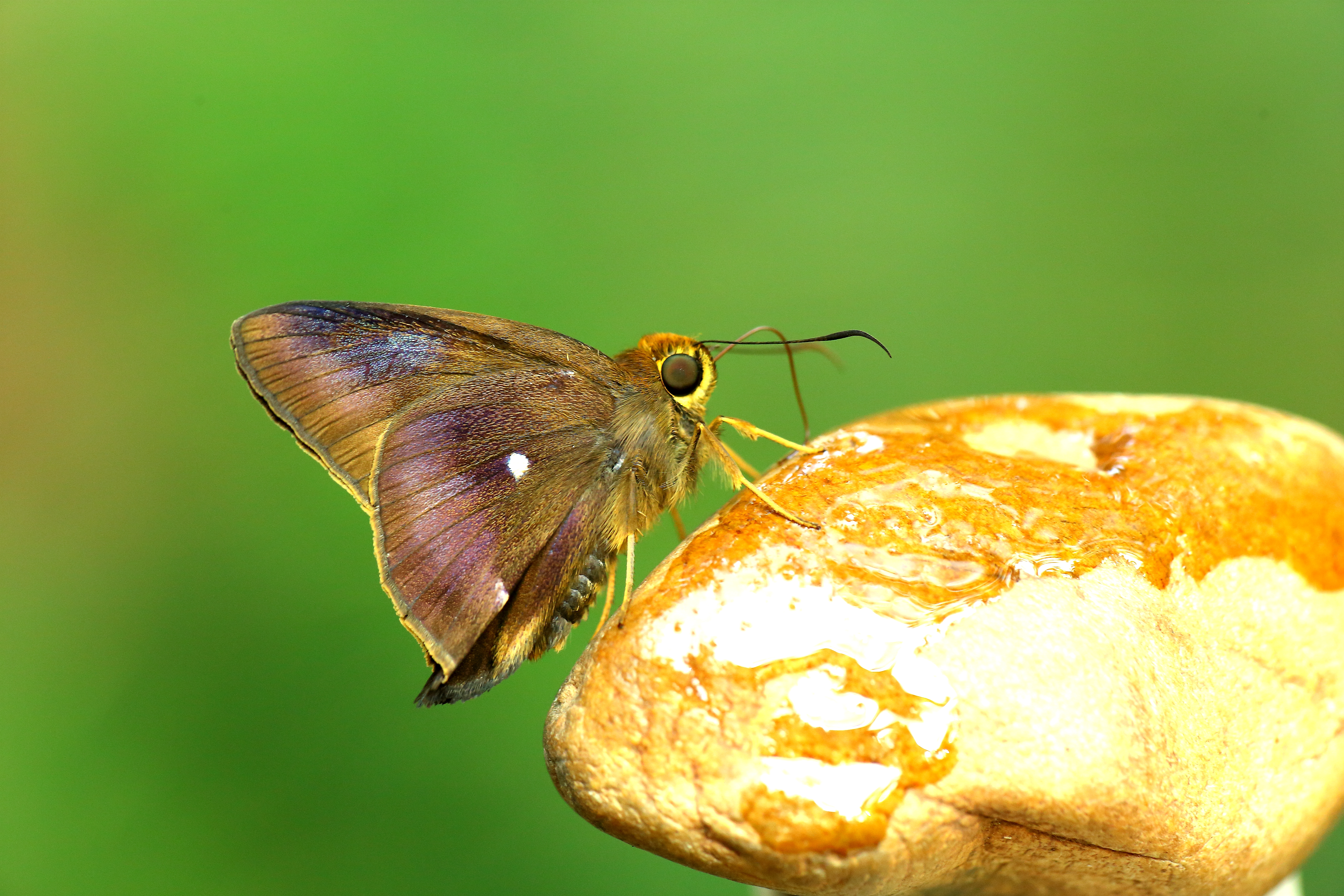
Common awl (Hasora badra)

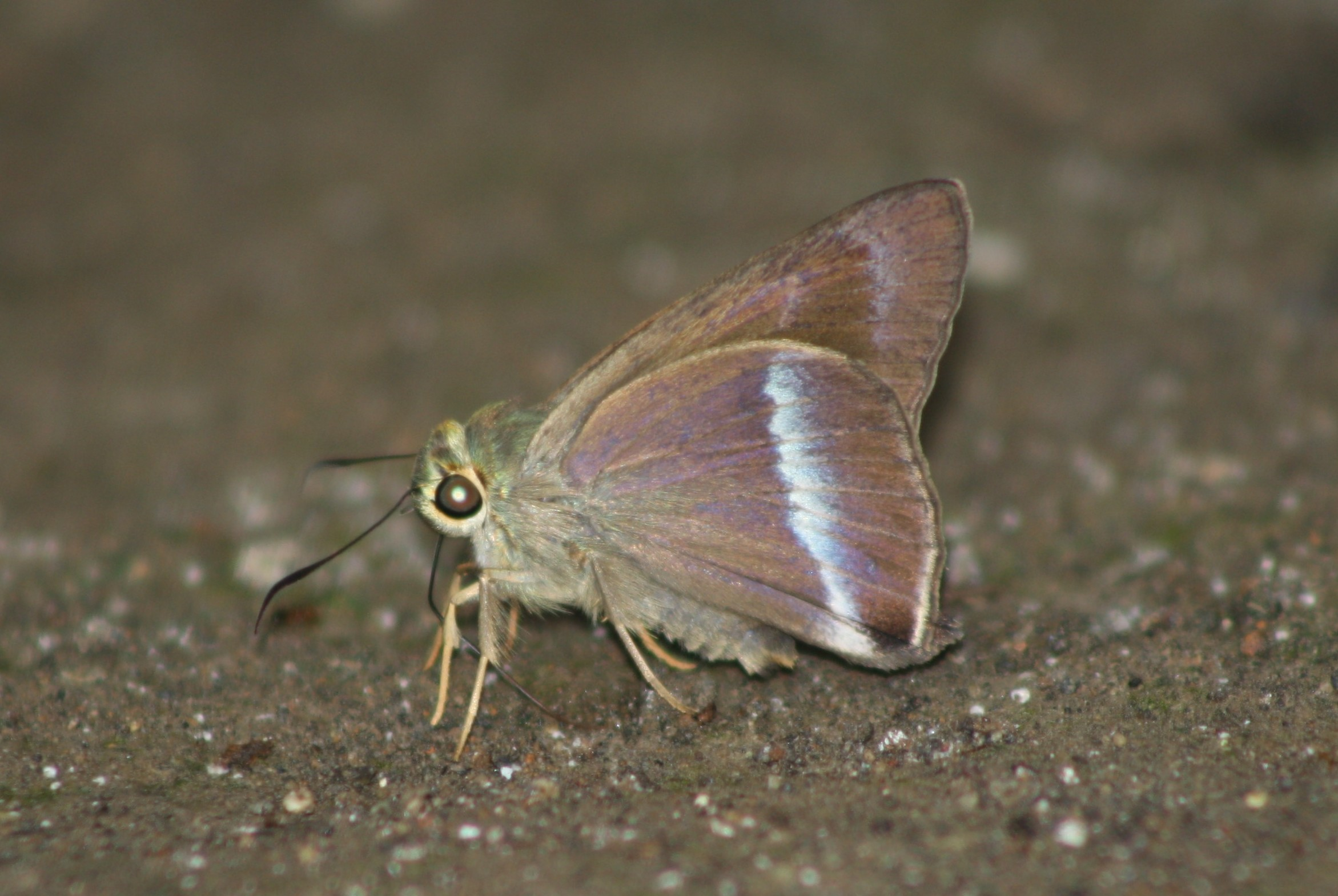
Plain banded awl (Hasora vitta)

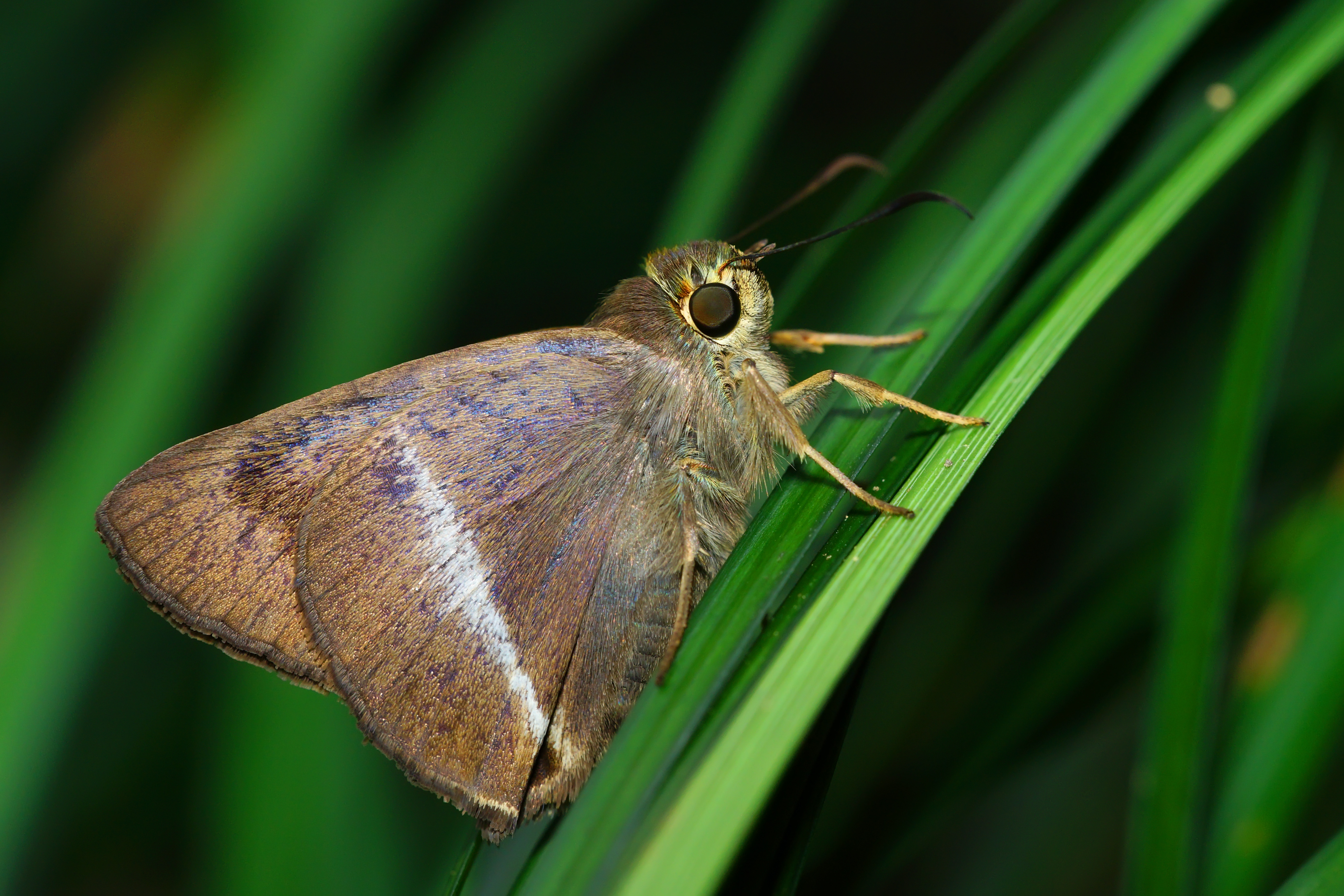
White banded awl (Hasora taminatus)

== Habits ==
In India, the common banded awl is the most common of the awls or Coeliadinae subfamily of skippers. It has a rapid and whirring flight which is audible at close quarters. It is less averse to sunshine than other awls and is often found flying around bushes in bright sunshine. It can be seen visiting flowers early in the day and sometimes basks on leaves, often with its wings slightly parted. It rests with wings closed.

== Life cycle ==
Eggs: Laid singly on young shoots, or on new leaves, both above and below. The egg is pinkish white when laid, dome shaped with a flattened top, and with minute longitudinal ridges. These are bead patterned and have fine transverse striations. The egg turns dirty white as it matures.
Caterpillar: The caterpillar is cylindriform with a constricted second segment which appears as a neck with a black collar. The head is lobed, rounded and yellowish red in colour. The caterpillar is yellowish black with brown sides which range from pale to dark brown in colour. The markings are very variable. The caterpillar is greenish white below tinged with yellow. Sometimes the green extends all over the body along with the dark markings. When newly born, the caterpillar eats the eggshelf, usually incompletely and scuttles off to a leaf where it hurriedly makes a cell for itself. Active when young, it becomes lethargic as it grows. The caterpillar ventures forth to feed only when the light is very low and at night.
Pupa: The pupa is stout, pale brown, with white abdomen and a prominent projection on the head between bulbous eyes.

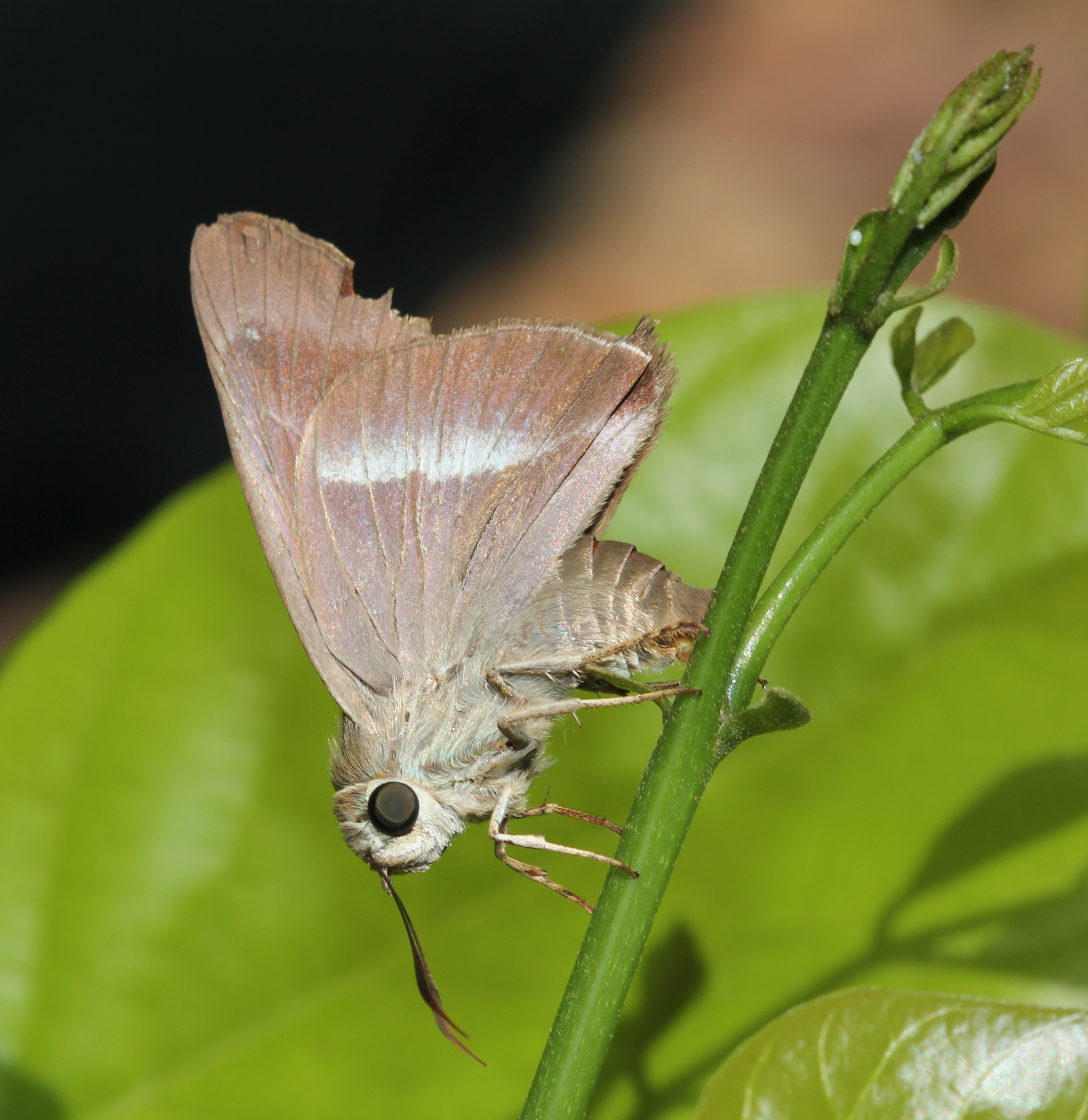
Egg laying

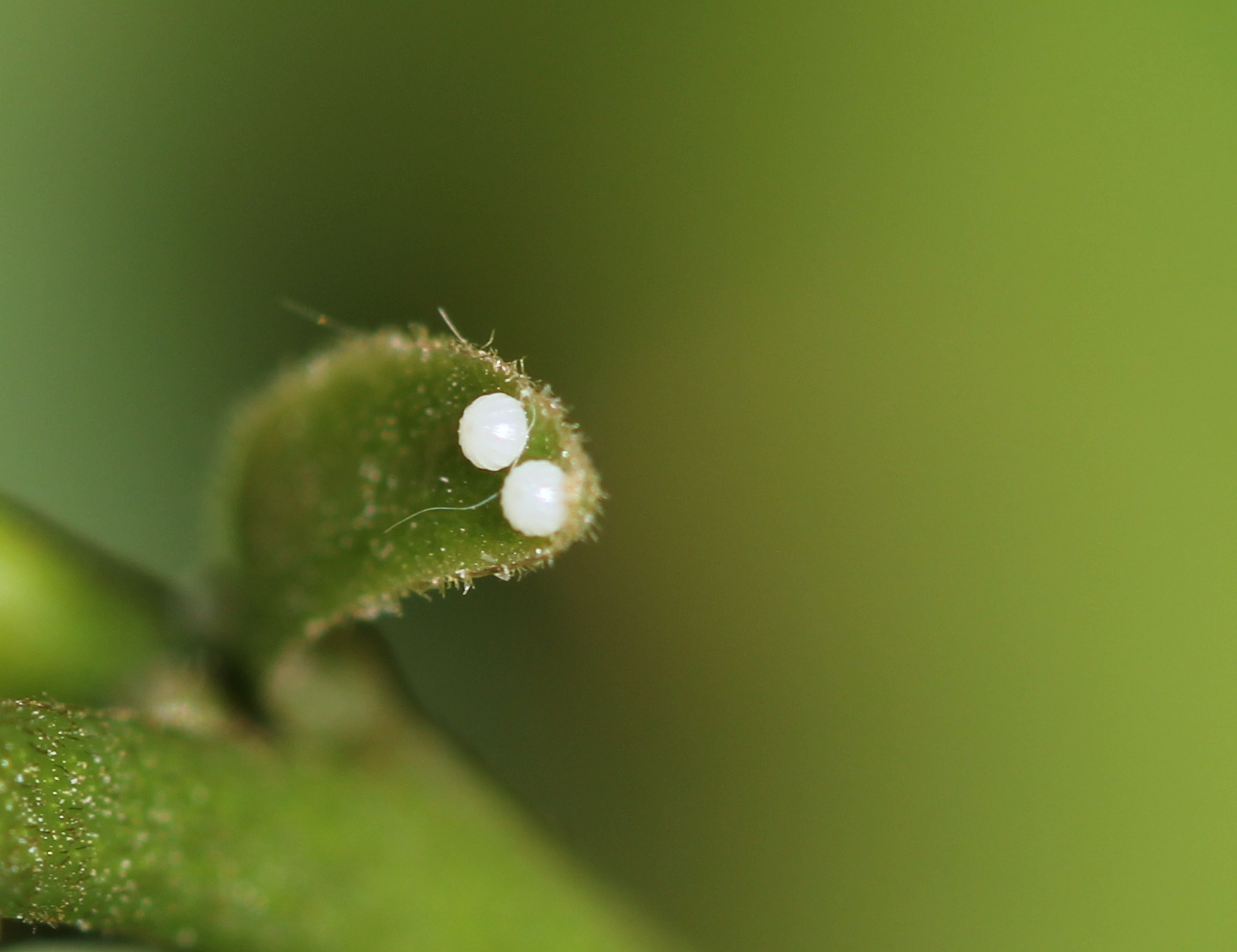
Eggs

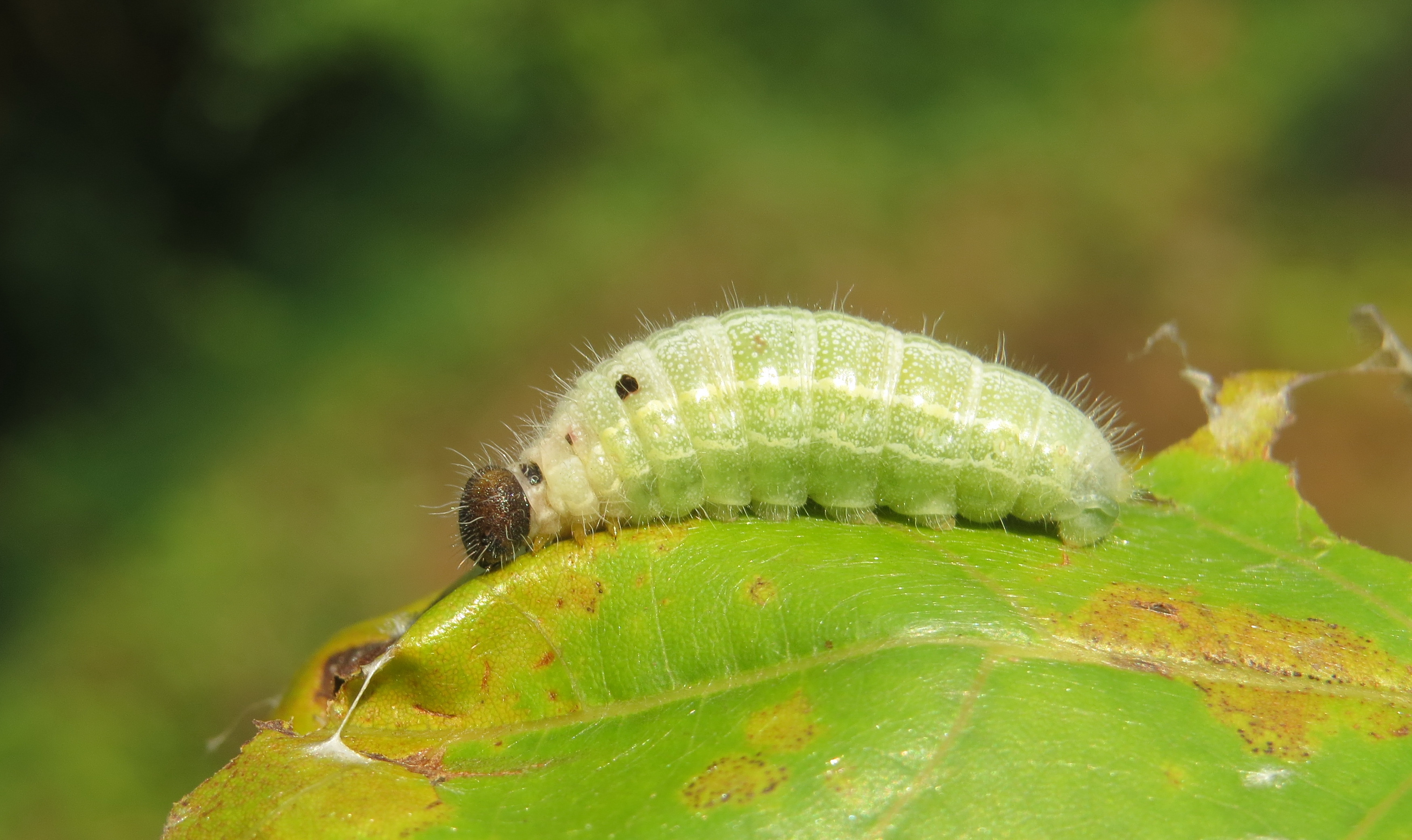
Caterpillar

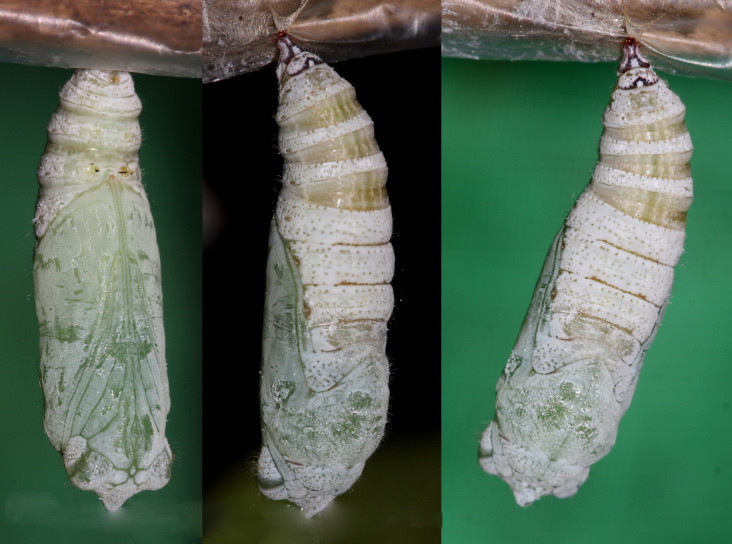
Pupa

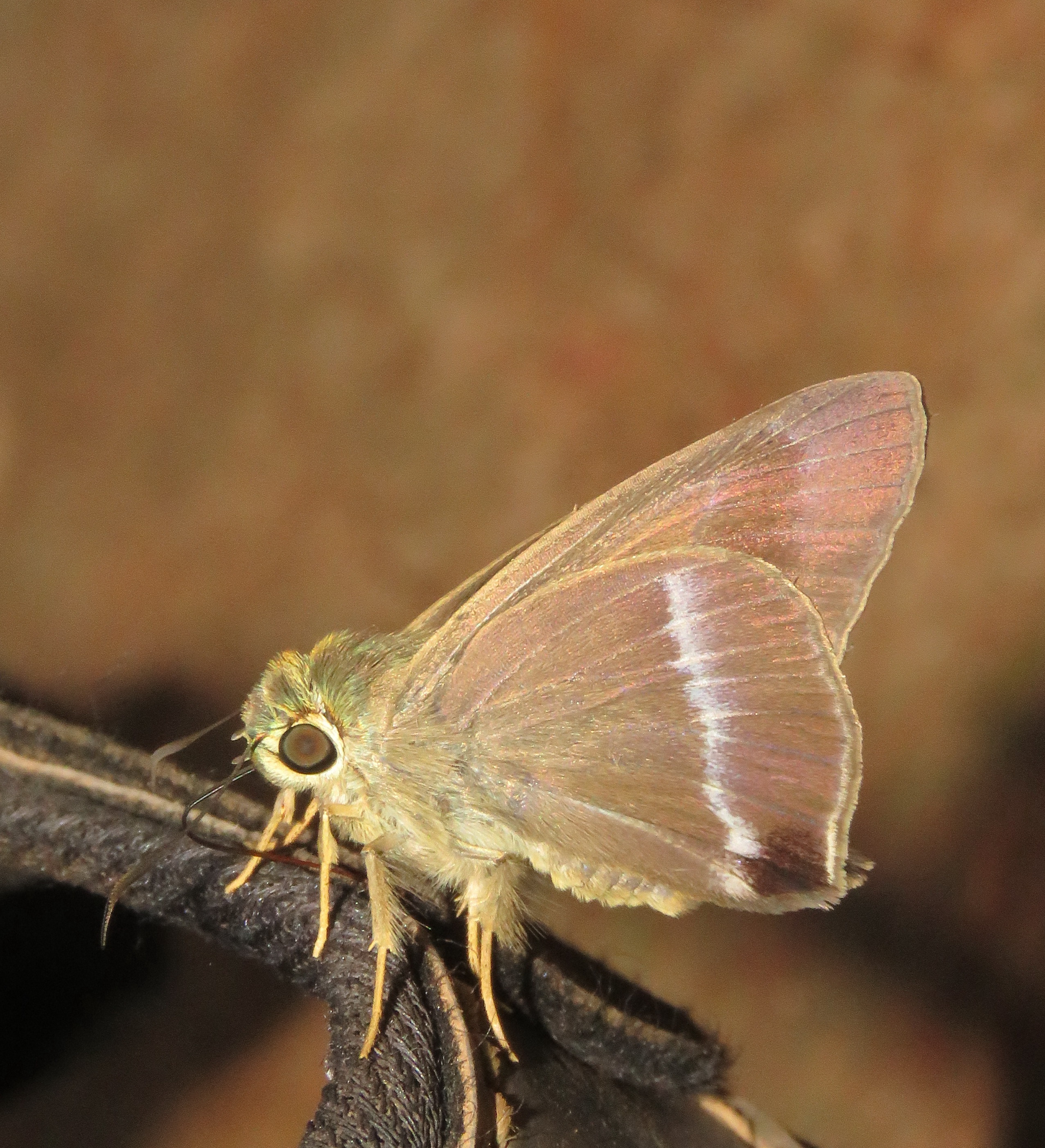
Adult

Host plants The larva (caterpillar) has been recorded on Ricinus communis, Derris scandens, Pongamia pinnata, Heynea trijuga and Toddalia asiatica.

== See also ==
- Hesperiidae
- List of butterflies of India (Coeliadinae)
- List of butterflies of India (Hesperiidae)
