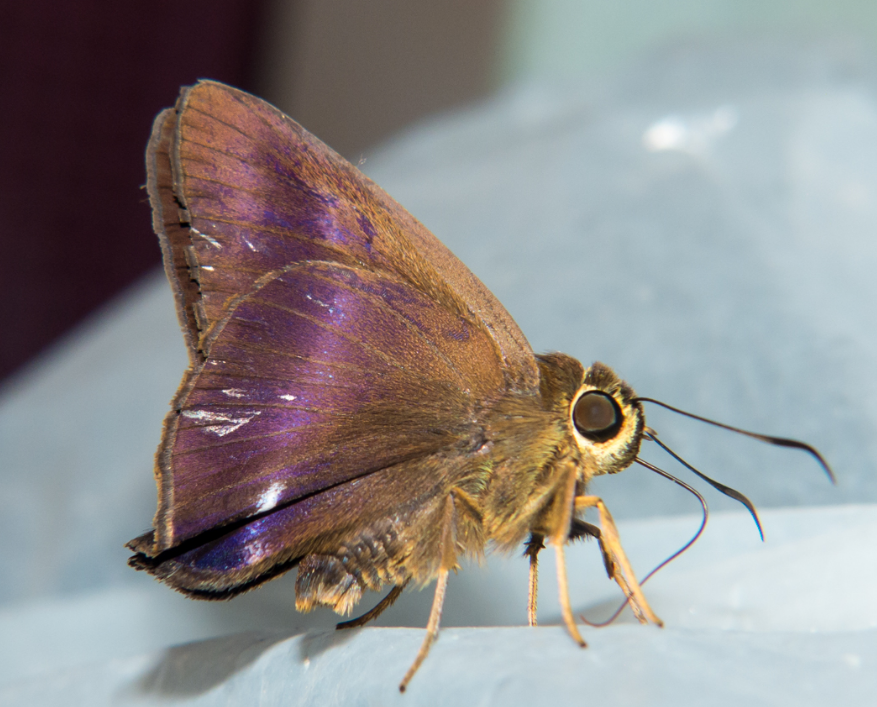

Scientific classification
- Kingdom: Animalia
- Phylum: Arthropoda
- Class: Insecta
- Order: Lepidoptera
- Family: Hesperiidae
- Genus: Hasora
- Species: H. leucospila

Binomial name
- Hasora leucospila (Mabille, 1891)

Synonyms
- Hasora matisca Fruhstorfer, 1911; Hasora palinda Swinhoe, 1905; Hasora parnia Fruhstorfer, 1911; Ismene leucospila Mabille, 1891

= Hasora leucospila =

Species of butterfly

Hasora leucospila is a species of butterfly belonging to the family Hesperiidae which is found in Southeast Asia (Burma, Thailand, Malay Peninsula, Sumatra, Java, Borneo, Philippines, Sulawesi, Cambodia).

There are two subspecies accepted in this species:

- Hasora leucospila subsp. leucospila
- Hasora leucospila subsp. spila Evans, 1949

== See also ==
- Coeliadinae
