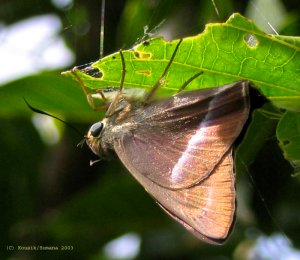
- Common banded awl Hasora chromus

Scientific classification
- Kingdom: Animalia
- Phylum: Arthropoda
- Clade: Pancrustacea
- Class: Insecta
- Order: Lepidoptera
- Family: Hesperiidae
- Subfamily: Coeliadinae
- Genus: Hasora; Moore, 1881

Species
- Several, see text

= Hasora =

Awls

Genus of butterflies

Hasora, the awls, are a genus of skipper butterflies. Hasora species are found in the Indomalayan and Australasian realms. There are cryptic species in this genus.Genitalia analysis is the only reliable method for identification as many species are externally almost identical.

== Species ==
- Hasora alexis (Fabricius); - India, Sri Lanka, Baluchistan, Burma
- Hasora alta de Jong, 1982 -Sumatra.
- Hasora anura de Nicéville, 1889- Burma, Thailand, Laos
- Hasora badra (Moore, [1858] India, Sri Lanka, Malaysia, China, Japan, Sumatra, Java, Borneo, Sulawesi
- Hasora borneensis Elwes & Edwards, 1897 Borneo
- Hasora buina Evans, 1926 – Solomon Islands
- Hasora caeruleostriata de Jong, 1982- Philippines.
- Hasora celaenus (Stoll, 1782); Moluccas, New Guinea
- Hasora chromus (Cramer, [1780]) - S.China, Malaysia and Australia
  - Hasora chromus chromus
  - Hasora chromus inermis Elwes & Edwards, 1897- Japan
- Hasora danda Evans, 1949- Burma, Thailand, Laos
- Hasora discolor (C. & R. Felder, 1859)- Australia and New Guinea
- Hasora fushigina Maruyama & Ueda, 1992- S E Asia islands
- Hasora hurama (Butler, 1870); Australia and New Guinea
- Hasora khoda (Mabille, 1876)
  - Hasora khoda coulteri Wood-Mason et de Nicéville, [1887] India, Burma and Thailand
  - Hasora khoda dampierensis Rothschild, 1915- New Guinea.
  - Hasora khoda haslia Swinhoe, 1899- Australia
  - Hasora khoda latalba de Jong, 1982 Sulawesi
- Hasora mavis Evans, 1934 – Thailand, Malaysia, Philippines.
- Hasora lavella Evans, 1928- Solomon Islands
- Hasora leucospila (Mabille, 1891)- Malaysia, Thailand, Burma, Sumatra, Java, Borneo, Sulawesi
- Hasora lizetta (Plötz, [1883])- Malaysia, Java .
- Hasora mixta (Mabille, 1876) Region
- Hasora moestissima (Mabille, 1876) Region
- Hasora mus Elwes et Edwards, 1897- Malaysia.
- Hasora myra (Hewitson, [1867])- Malaysia, Thailand
- Hasora perplexa (Mabille, 1876) Region
- Hasora proximata (Staudinger, 1889)
- Hasora proxissima Elwes et Edwards, 1897 Region
  - Hasora proxissima chalybeia Inoue & Kawazoe, 1964; Vietnam
  - Hasora proxissima siamica Evans, 1932- Thailand, Laos
  - Hasora proxissima siva Evans, 1932 Borneo
- Hasora quadripunctata (Mabille, 1876) Region
- Hasora sakit Maruyama et Ueda, 1992; S E Asia islands
- Hasora salanga (Plötz, 1885) Malaysia, Thailand, Burma, Sumatra, Borneo
- Hasora schoenherr (Latreille, [1824])- Malaysia, Java
  - Hasora schoenherr chuza (Hewitson, [1867]) -Thailand, Malaysia, Sumatra, Borneo
  - Hasora schoenherr gaspa Evans, 1949- India, Thailand, Burma, Laos, Vietnam
- Hasora simillima Rothschild, 1916- Region
- Hasora subcaelestis Rothschild, 1916- New Guinea.
- Hasora takwa Evans, 1949 - New Guinea.
- Hasora taminatus (Hübner, [1818])- Region
  - Hasora taminatus taminatus – India, Sri Lanka, Burma
  - Hasora taminatus amboinensis Swinhoe, 1909- Papua New Guinea
  - Hasora taminatus attenuata (Mabille, 1904) Sulawesi
  - Hasora taminatus bhavara Fruhstorfer, 1911 Sikkim
  - Hasora taminatus malayana (C. & R. Felder, 1860) – India, Thailand, Burma, Laos, Malaysia, Java Sumatra, Borneo.
  - Hasora taminatus vairacana Fruhstorfer- Taiwan, Japan
  - Hasora thridas (Boisduval, 1832)- New Guinea
- Hasora umbrina (Mabille, 1891)- Vanatau
- Hasora vitta (Butler, 1870) -Burma, Malaysia, Philippines
  - Hasora vitta vitta
  - Hasora vitta indica Evans, 1932 South India, Burma, Thailand, China (W)
- Hasora wilcocksi Eliot, 1970- Malaysia
- Hasora zoma Evans, 1934 Malaysia, Thailand, Sumatra
