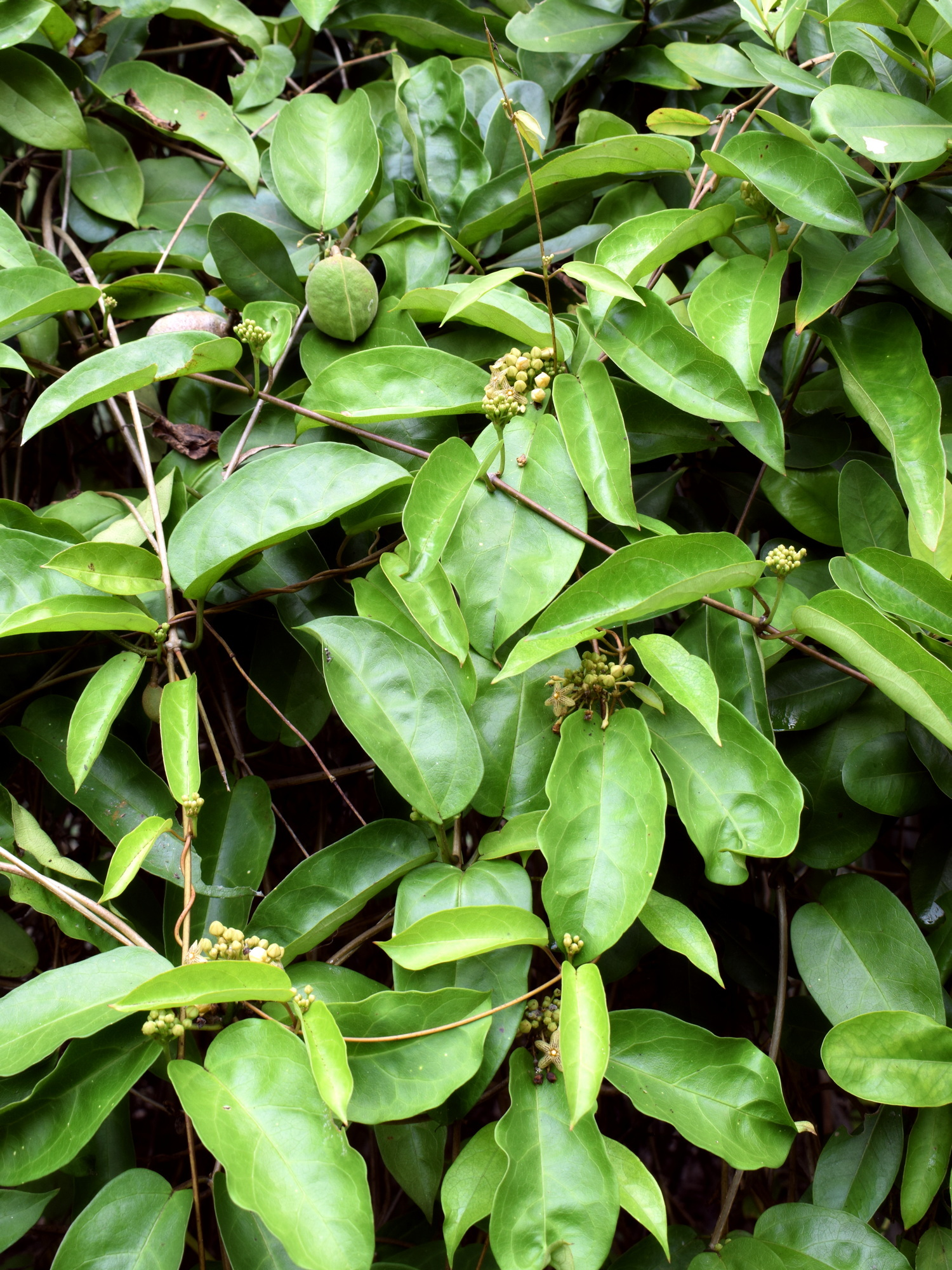
- Sarcolobus globosus

Scientific classification
- Kingdom: Plantae
- Clade: Tracheophytes
- Clade: Angiosperms
- Clade: Eudicots
- Clade: Asterids
- Order: Gentianales
- Family: Apocynaceae
- Subfamily: Asclepiadoideae
- Tribe: Marsdenieae
- Genus: Sarcolobus; R.Br.

Type species
- Sarcolobus banksii Schult., syn. of Sarcolobus globosus subsp. globosus

Synonyms
- Astelma Schltr., nom. illeg.; Dorystephania Warb.; Gunnessia P.I.Forst.; Papuastelma Bullock; Petalonema Schltr., non Berkeley ex Correns (1889); Quisumbingia Merr.; Schlechterianthus Quisumb.

= Sarcolobus =

Genus of plants

Sarcolobus is a plant genus in the family Apocynaceae, first established as a genus in 1809. It is native from Bangladesh through Southeast Asia, to New Guinea, Australia, and certain islands of the Western Pacific.

== Species ==
As of November 2023, Plants of the World Online accepted the following species:

- Sarcolobus borneensis (Steenis) P.I.Forst.
- Sarcolobus brachystephanus (Schltr.) P.I.Forst.
- Sarcolobus cambogensis McHone & Livsh.
- Sarcolobus carinatus Wall.
- Sarcolobus globosus Wall.
- Sarcolobus hullsii (F.Muell. ex Benth.) P.I.Forst.
- Sarcolobus kaniensis (Schltr.) P.I.Forst.
- Sarcolobus luzonensis (Warb.) P.I.Forst.
- Sarcolobus merrillii (Schltr.) Omlor
- Sarcolobus oblongus Rintz
- Sarcolobus pepo (P.I.Forst.) S.Reuss, Liede & Meve
- Sarcolobus pierrei Costantin
- Sarcolobus porcatus P.I.Forst.
- Sarcolobus retusus K.Schum.
- Sarcolobus ritae P.I.Forst.
- Sarcolobus rubescens P.I.Forst.
- Sarcolobus secamonoides (Schltr.) P.I.Forst.
- Sarcolobus spathulatus P.I.Forst.
- Sarcolobus stenophyllus (A.Gray) P.I.Forst.
- Sarcolobus subnudus (A.Gray) P.I.Forst.
- Sarcolobus venulosus (A.C.Sm.) P.I.Forst.
- Sarcolobus vittatus P.I.Forst.
