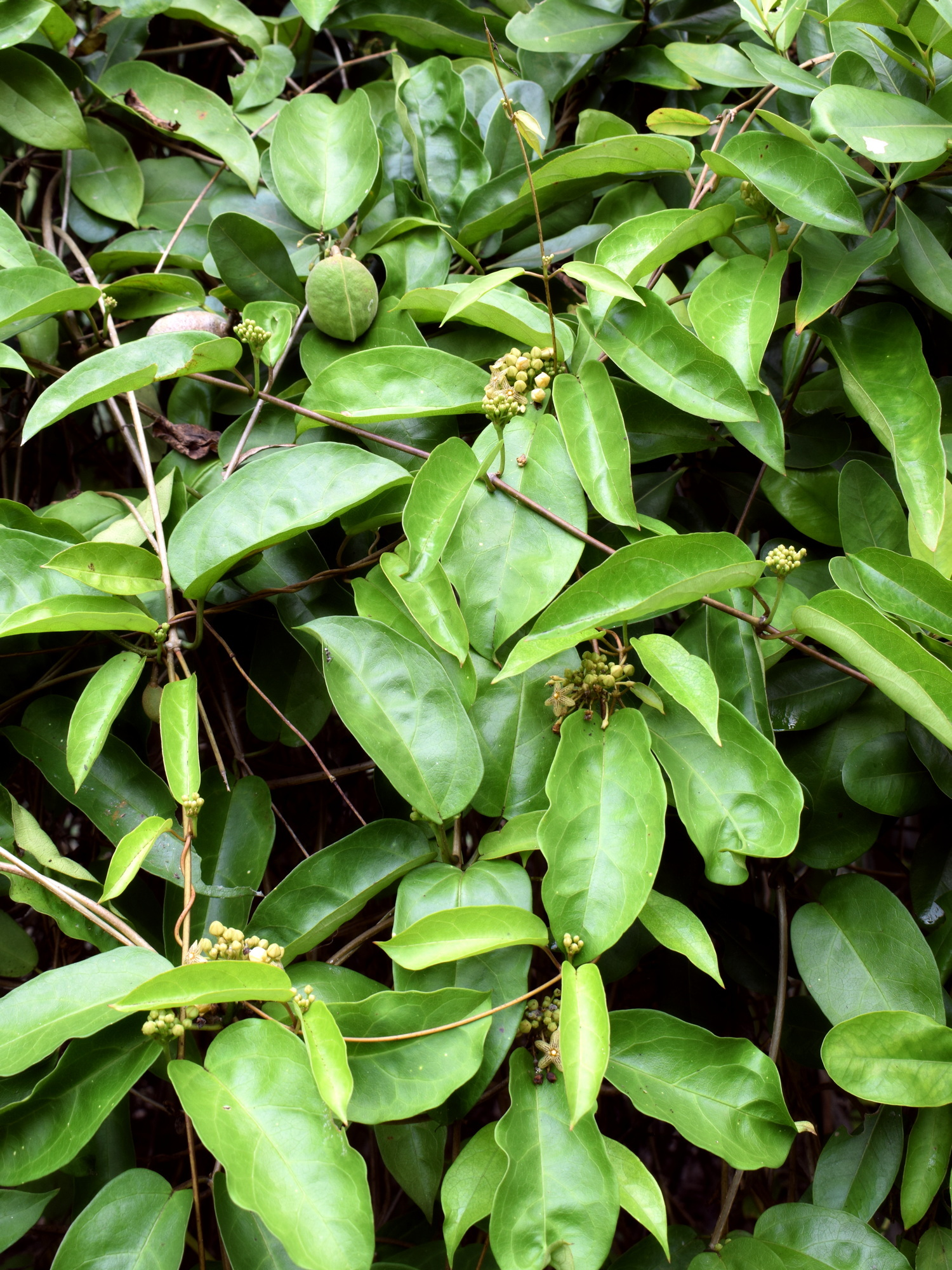

Scientific classification
- Kingdom: Plantae
- Clade: Tracheophytes
- Clade: Angiosperms
- Clade: Eudicots
- Clade: Asterids
- Order: Gentianales
- Family: Apocynaceae
- Genus: Sarcolobus
- Species: S. globosus

Binomial name
- Sarcolobus globosus Wall.

= Sarcolobus globosus =

Species of shrub

Sarcolobus globosus is a twining shrub native to tropical regions of Asia including India, China, Thailand, Malaysia, Myanmar-Burma, the Philippines and Indonesia.

In India the plant is found in the mangrove forests of West Bengal, Orissa, Andhra Pradesh, Sundarbans and Andaman and Nicobar Islands. Traditional practices in these regions use the leaves and rhizomes as medicine; and the seeds are poisonous and used as bait to kill dogs and wild animals.

== Description ==
The plant is a twining shrub with stout glabrous branches, root-stock thick, and fleshy; roots thick. Leaves are simple, opposite, 3-6x2-4.5 cm, ovate or oblong, thick and fleshy, acute or obtuse at apex, rounded at base. Inflorescence cymosely. Flowers small, starry, crowded, in axillary corymbose cymes, 2–3 mm across; corolla purplish, lobes pubescent inside. Follicles brown, 4–5 cm across, sub-globose; seeds are many and flattened. Cotyledons often large, radicle terete.

In the mangroves of India it is often found in association with and climbing on Phoenix paludosa.

Flowering and fruiting occur during June–September, October–January, respectively. In Andhra Pradesh fruiting is recorded as early as during August–October.

== Chemical constituents ==
S. globosus is a rich source of flavonoids, rotenoids and phenolyc glycosides. Rotenoids such as tephrosin, 12aalpha-hydroxydeguelin, 11-hydroxytephrosin, 12a-hydroxyrotenone, 12aalpha-hydroxyrotenone, 6aalpha,12aalpha-12a-hydroxyelliptone, 6a,12a-dehydrodeguelin, and 13-homo-13-oxa-6a,12a-dehydrodeguelin, villosinol and 6-oxo-6a,12a-dehydrodeguelin are identified. Isoflavones like barbigerone, genistin and a chromone 6,7-dimethoxy-2,3-dihydrochromone were identified. The isoflavone sarcolobone and the rotenoid sarcolobin were isolated from the stem and are unique to the species. Four phenolic glycosides including vanillic acid 4-O-beta-d-glucoside, glucosyringic acid, tachioside and isotachioside are reported.

== Uses ==
=== Poison ===
S. globosus is listed by the U.S. Food and Drug Administration (FDA) as poisonous plant. The seeds are known to be highly toxic to mammals. Native people of Asia widely use it to kill dogs and wild animals. It was demonstrated that it effectively killed cats, and there are accounts of its use in Java in the 19th century to kill tigers. The plant extract causes inhibition of the neuro-muscular system. The symptoms of poisoning in animals include blood urine and nephrosis.

=== Medicine ===
The plant has been used as an herbal medicine for treatment of rheumatism, dengue and fever. The plant is known to contain barbigerone which is validated to have significant antioxidant property, highly effective against the malarial parasite Plasmodium falciparum, and with anti-cancer potential as it causes apoptosis of murine lung-cancer cells.

== See also ==
- Barbigerone
