= Derris elegans =

Scientific classification
- Kingdom: Plantae
- Clade: Tracheophytes
- Clade: Angiosperms
- Clade: Eudicots
- Clade: Rosids
- Order: Fabales
- Family: Fabaceae
- Subfamily: Faboideae
- Genus: Derris
- Species: D. elegans

Binomial name
- Derris elegans Graham ex Benth. in Miq., 1852

Varieties
- Derris elegans var. gracillima (Hemsl.) Verdc.; Derris elegans var. korthalsiana (Blume ex Miq.) Adema; Derris elegans var. vestita Prain

Synonyms
- Derris elegans var. elegans; Derris rufula K.Schum. & Lauterb.; Pongamia elegans Graham

Species of legume

Derris elegans is a species of leguminous plants. It is found in Papua New Guinea.
