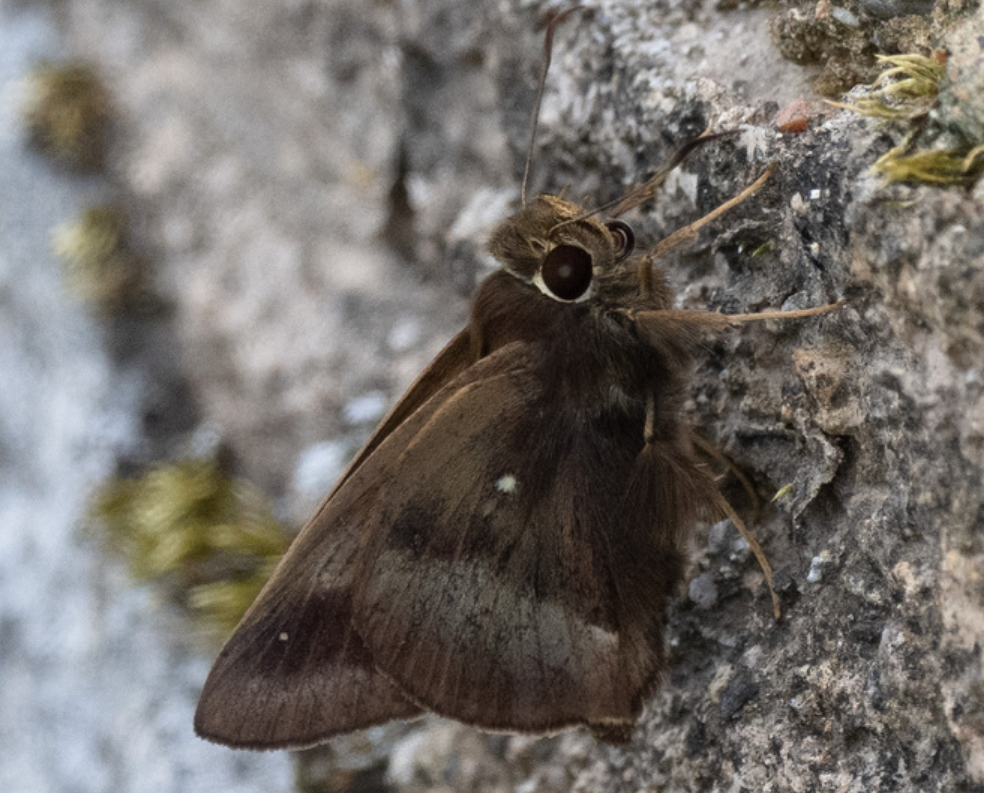

Scientific classification
- Domain: Eukaryota
- Kingdom: Animalia
- Phylum: Arthropoda
- Class: Insecta
- Order: Lepidoptera
- Family: Hesperiidae
- Genus: Hasora
- Species: H. anura

Binomial name
- Hasora anura (de Niceville, 1889)

= Hasora anura =

Slate awl

Species of butterfly

Hasora anura, the slate awl, is a species of hesperid butterfly found in Asia. In India it is found in Sikkim and the Khasi Hills.

== Range ==
In India the butterfly ranges from Mussoorie eastwards to Sikkim, the Shan states in Myanmar, Thailand, south-west and central China (Yunnan).

The type locality is Sikkim.

== Status ==
William Harry Evans (1932) described the species as rare.

== Description ==
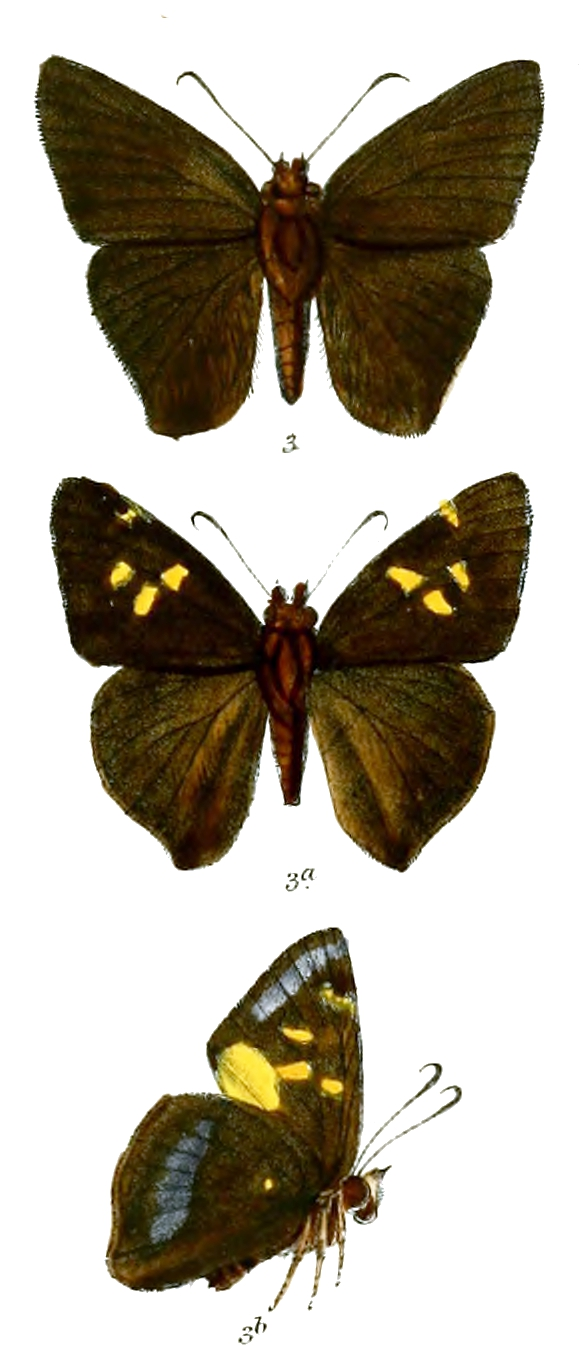
From top - male, female, female underside

Edward Yerbury Watson (1891) gives a detailed description, shown below:

Male upperside, both wings deep bronzy-brown, the base and disc thickly clothed with long ochreous-brown hairs; cilia ochreous-brown. Forewing with a minute subapical transparent shining yellow dot. Underside, both wings dark brown, somewhat glossed with purple. Forewing with the inner margin broadly pale, a broad discal dark band free from purple gloss. Hindwing with the basal two-thirds much darker than the outer third, the dark portion well-defined, bearing towards the abdominal margin on the dividing edge a small prominent ochreous spot, an ochreous anteciliary line from the anal angle to the first median nervule, the ochreous spot and line obscure in one specimen; a prominent whitish spot in the middle of the disc in one specimen, obscure in the other.

Female upperside, both wings coloured as in the male. Forewing with a quadrate spot at the end of the cell, an elongate one below across the first median interspace, its inner edge straight, its outer edge concave; another smaller narrow spot constricted in the middle across the middle of the second median interspace; three increasing subapical dots all these spots shining translucent rich ochreous. Underside, forewing with the spots of the upperside showing through, the inner margin broadly bright ochreous: otherwise as in the male. Closely allied to the common Hasora badra, Moore, from which it differs in both sexes in having no large anal lobe to the hindwing, this lobe being present in H. badra and coloured black on the underside, of which black patch there is no trace in H. anura; the latter also is a smaller insect; the female differs in having the three large discal yellow spots of the forewing considerably smaller, and of a deeper richer yellow.

== See also ==
- Coeliadinae
- Hesperiidae
- List of butterflies of India (Coeliadinae)
- List of butterflies of India (Hesperiidae)
