= Derris parviflora =

Scientific classification
- Kingdom: Plantae
- Clade: Tracheophytes
- Clade: Angiosperms
- Clade: Eudicots
- Clade: Rosids
- Order: Fabales
- Family: Fabaceae
- Subfamily: Faboideae
- Genus: Derris
- Species: D. parviflora

Binomial name
- Derris parviflora Benth.

Synonyms
- Brachypterum elegans Thwaites; Deguelia parviflora (Benth.) Taub.

Species of legume

Derris parviflora is a species of leguminous plants. it is found in Sri Lanka.
