= Barbigerone =

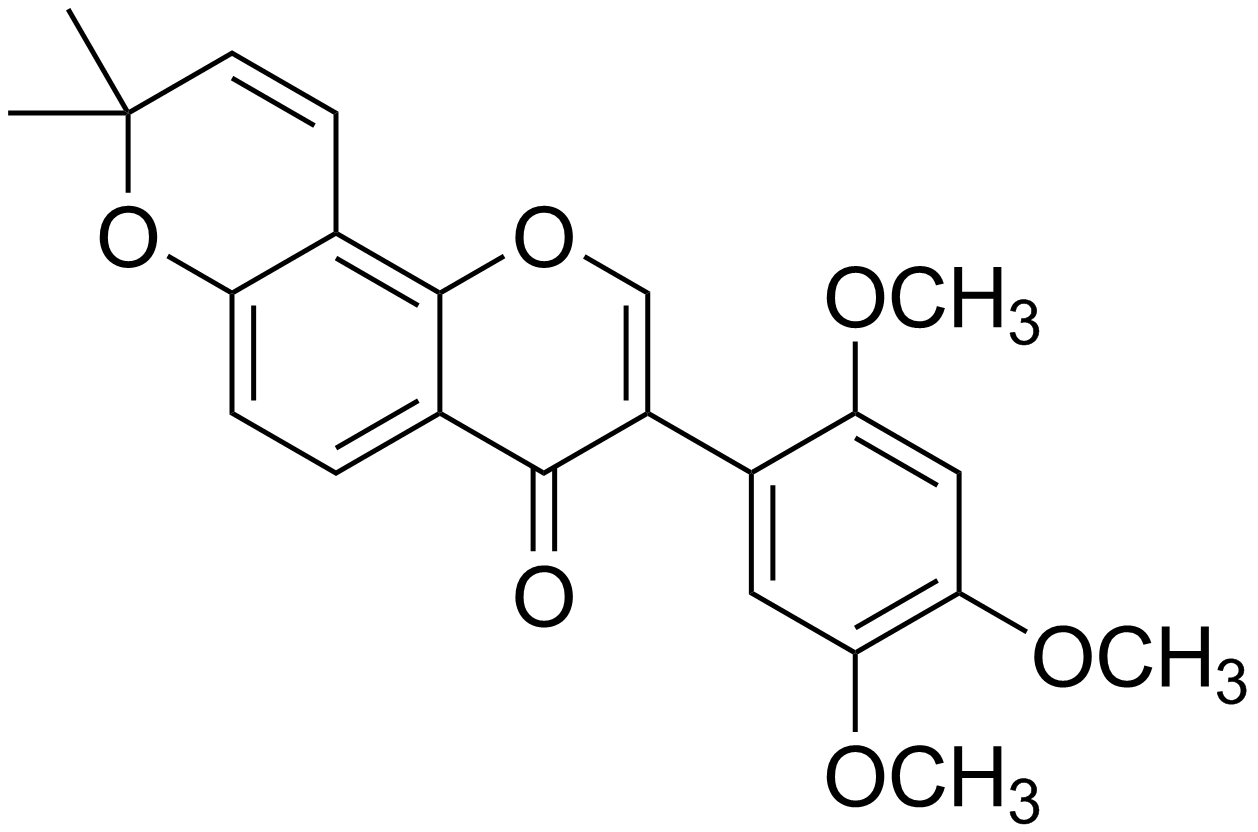

Names
- IUPAC name 2′,4′,5′-Trimethoxy-6′′,6′′-dimethyl-6′′H-pyrano[2′′,3′′:7,8]isoflavone
- Systematic IUPAC name 8,8-Dimethyl-3-(2,4,5-trimethoxyphenyl)-4H,8H-benzo[1,2-b:3,4-b′]dipyran-4-one
- Other names Barubigeron

Identifiers
CAS Number	75425-27-3 =
3D model (JSmol)	Interactive image
ChemSpider	138031
MeSH	C543999
PubChem CID	156793
UNII	9BE3F2B4GD
CompTox Dashboard (EPA)	DTXSID30226352
- InChI: InChI=1S/C23H22O6/c1-23(2)9-8-13-17(29-23)7-6-14-21(24)16(12-28-22(13)14)15-10-19(26-4)20(27-5)11-18(15)25-3/h6-12H,1-5H3 Key: OBIUGMGQVQMVSK-UHFFFAOYSA-N; InChI=1/C23H22O6/c1-23(2)9-8-13-17(29-23)7-6-14-21(24)16(12-28-22(13)14)15-10-19(26-4)20(27-5)11-18(15)25-3/h6-12H,1-5H3 Key: OBIUGMGQVQMVSK-UHFFFAOYAE
- SMILES: O=C3C(=C/Oc2c1\C=C/C(Oc1ccc23)(C)C)\c4cc(OC)c(OC)cc4OC

Properties
Chemical formula	C_{23}H_{22}O_{6}
Molar mass	394 g/mol
- Except where otherwise noted, data are given for materials in their standard state (at 25 °C [77 °F], 100 kPa). verify (what is ?) Infobox references

Barbigerone is one of a few pyranoisoflavones among several groups of isoflavones. It was first isolated from the seed of a leguminous plant Tephrosia barbigera; hence the name "barbigerone". Members of the genus Millettia are now known to be rich in barbigerone, including M. dielsiena, M. ferruginea, M. usaramensis, and M. pachycarpa. It has also been isolated from the medicinal plant Sarcolobus globosus. Barbigerone from S. globosus is validated to have significant antioxidant property. Barbigerone exhibits profound antiplasmodial activity against the malarial parasite Plasmodium falciparum. It is also demonstrated that it has anti-cancer potential as it causes apoptosis of murine lung-cancer cells.
