= Macluraxanthone =

Names
- Preferred IUPAC name 5,9,10-Trihydroxy-2,2-dimethyl-12-(2-methylbut-3-en-2-yl)pyrano[3,2-b]xanthen-6-one

Identifiers
CAS Number	5848-14-6
3D model (JSmol)	Interactive image
ChEBI	CHEBI:6623
ChEMBL	ChEMBL478960
ChemSpider	4444965
KEGG	C10076
PubChem CID	5281646
UNII	9GN3KT96MT
CompTox Dashboard (EPA)	DTXSID40207172
- InChI: InChI=1S/C23H22O6/c1-6-22(2,3)15-19-12(9-10-23(4,5)29-19)17(26)14-16(25)11-7-8-13(24)18(27)20(11)28-21(14)15/h6-10,24,26-27H,1H2,2-5H3 Key: XRVLGJCHUWXTDX-UHFFFAOYSA-N
- SMILES: CC1(C=CC2=C(C3=C(C(=C2O1)C(C)(C)C=C)OC4=C(C3=O)C=CC(=C4O)O)O)C

Properties
Chemical formula	C_{23}H_{22}O_{6}
Molar mass	394.423 g·mol^{−1}
- Except where otherwise noted, data are given for materials in their standard state (at 25 °C [77 °F], 100 kPa). Infobox references

Macluraxanthone is a naturally occurring organic compound with the formula C_{23}H_{22}O_{6}. Belonging to the xanthone family, it is a trihydroxylated xanthone characterized by the presence of a pyran ring and a prenyl chain.

Its structure features a catechol moiety, a xanthene core, and a chromene ring. Acetylation of macluraxanthone yields a triacetate derivative with the formula C_{29}H_{28}O_{9}. X-ray crystallography of a synthesized derivative (Di-p-bromobenzenesulfonyl-macluraxanthone) reveals a planar xanthene ring system and a screw boat conformation in the chromene ring. Macluraxanthone has demonstrated antimalarial and larvicidal activity, including effects against Plasmodium falciparum and vector mosquito larvae. Additional studies have reported antibacterial activity against Enterococcus faecalis.
