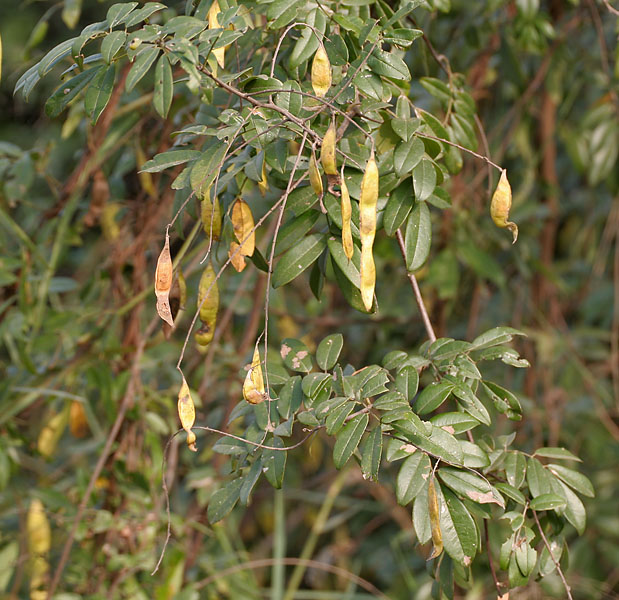
- Derris scandens in Hyderabad

Scientific classification
- Kingdom: Plantae
- Clade: Tracheophytes
- Clade: Angiosperms
- Clade: Eudicots
- Clade: Rosids
- Order: Fabales
- Family: Fabaceae
- Subfamily: Faboideae
- Tribe: Millettieae
- Genus: Derris; Lour. (1790), nom. cons.

Species
- 65; see text

Synonyms
- Cylizoma Neck. (1790), opus utique oppr.; Nothoderris Blume ex Miq. (1855), not validly publ.; Paraderris (Miq.) R.Geesink (1984); Pterocarpus Kuntze (1891), nom. illeg.; Salken Adans. (1763), nom. rej.

= Derris =

Genus of legumes

Derris is genus of leguminous plants. It contains 65 species, which range from eastern Africa to the Indian subcontinent, Southeast Asia, New Guinea, northern Australia, and the southwest Pacific islands. The roots of D. elliptica contain rotenone, a strong insecticide and fish poison.

Despite the secondary compounds found in Derris, they serve as food plants for many Lepidopteran larvae including Batrachedra spp.

== Species ==
65 species are currently accepted:

- Derris acuminata Benth.
- Derris alborubra Hemsl.
- Derris amoena Benth.
- Derris andamanica Prain
- Derris benthamii (Thwaites) Thwaites
- Derris brevipes (Benth.) Baker
- Derris breviramosa F.C.How
- Derris canarensis (Dalzell) Baker
- Derris caudatilimba F.C.How
- Derris cavaleriei Gagnep.
- Derris chinensis Benth.
- Derris cuneifolia Benth.
- Derris elegans Benth.
- Derris elliptica (Wall.) Benth.
- Derris emarginata Valeton
- Derris entadoides (Z.Wei) Z.Q.Song
- Derris ferruginea (Wall. ex Voigt) Benth.
- Derris fordii Oliv.
- Derris gamblei Soosairaj, P.Raja & Dhatchan.
- Derris glabra Sirich.
- Derris hainanensis Hayata
- Derris hainesiana Thoth.
- Derris harrowiana (Diels) Z.Wei
- Derris henryi Thoth.
- Derris heyneana (Wight & Arn.) Benth.
- Derris kanjilalii K.C.Sahni & H.B.Naithani
- Derris kingdonwardii Thoth.
- Derris lacei Dunn
- Derris laotica Gagnep.
- Derris lasiantha Hayata
- Derris laxiflora Benth.
- Derris lianoides Elmer
- Derris lushaiensis Thoth.
- Derris luzoniensis (Adema) Sirich. & Adema
- Derris macrocarpa Thoth.
- Derris marginata (Roxb.) Benth.
- Derris mariannensis Hosok.
- Derris matthewii Kottaim.
- Derris montana Benth.
- Derris monticola (Kurz) Prain
- Derris oblongifolia Merr.
- Derris oligosperma K.Schum. & Lauterb.
- Derris ornithocephala (Adema) Sirich. & Adema
- Derris ovalifolia (Wight & Arn.) Benth.
- Derris palmifolia Chun & F.C.How
- Derris parviflora Benth.
- Derris piscatoria (Blanco) Sirich. & Adema
- Derris polyantha G.Perkins
- Derris polyanthra Miq.
- Derris pseudomarginata Sirich.
- Derris pubipetala Miq.
- Derris pulchra Gage
- Derris reticulata Craib
- Derris rubrocalyx Verdc.
- Derris rubromaculata Chun & F.C.How
- Derris scabricaulis (Franch.) Gagnep. ex F.C.How
- Derris secunda Baker
- Derris solorioides Sirich. & Adema
- Derris spanogheana Blume ex Miq.
- Derris taiwaniana (Hayata) Z.Q.Song
- Derris thothathri Bennet
- Derris tonkinensis Gagnep.
- Derris trifoliata Lour. – common derris
- Derris yappii Craib
- Derris zambalensis Elmer

== See also ==
- "Derris" insecticides based on rotenone
