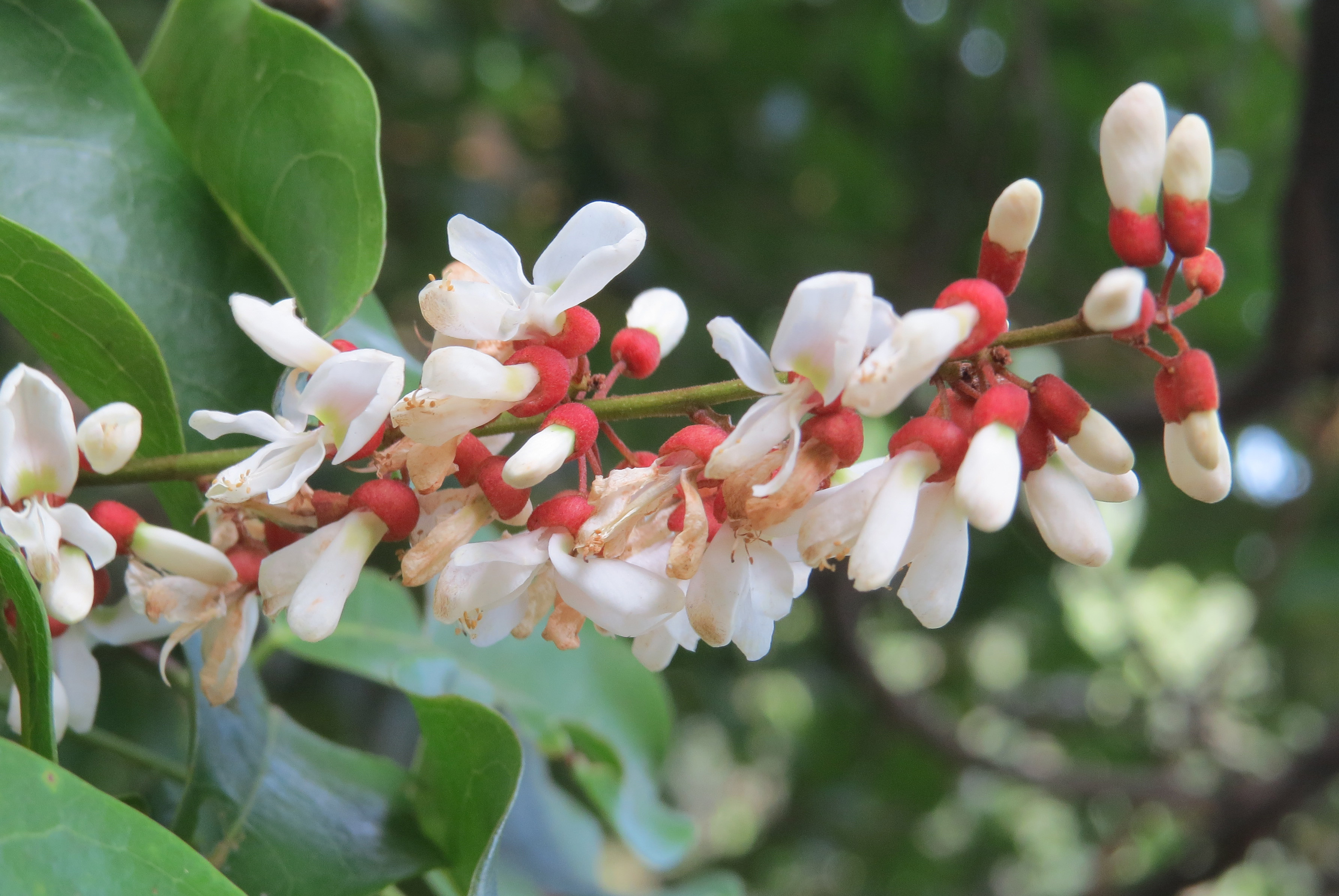

Scientific classification
- Kingdom: Plantae
- Clade: Tracheophytes
- Clade: Angiosperms
- Clade: Eudicots
- Clade: Rosids
- Order: Fabales
- Family: Fabaceae
- Subfamily: Faboideae
- Genus: Derris
- Species: D. scandens

Binomial name
- Derris scandens Roxb. (Benth.)

Synonyms
- Dalbergia scandens Roxb. Dalbergia timoriensis DC. Deguelia timoriensis (DC.) Taub.

= Derris scandens =

Species of legume

Derris scandens is a plant species in the genus Derris of the family Fabaceae. It grows throughout the Indian subcontinent, Southeast Asia, Malesia and Australasia. It has been used as a herb in Thai traditional medicine for the treatment of musculoskeletal pain. Gastrointestinal symptoms were reported as the most serious side effects from its oral use.
