= List of Millettia species =

Flowering plants in the legume family

Millettia is a large, broadly distributed genus of flowering plants in the legume family, Fabaceae. As of September 2023, there are 169 accepted species in Kew's Plants of the World Online. Species are found in tropical and subtropical areas throughout the Old World.

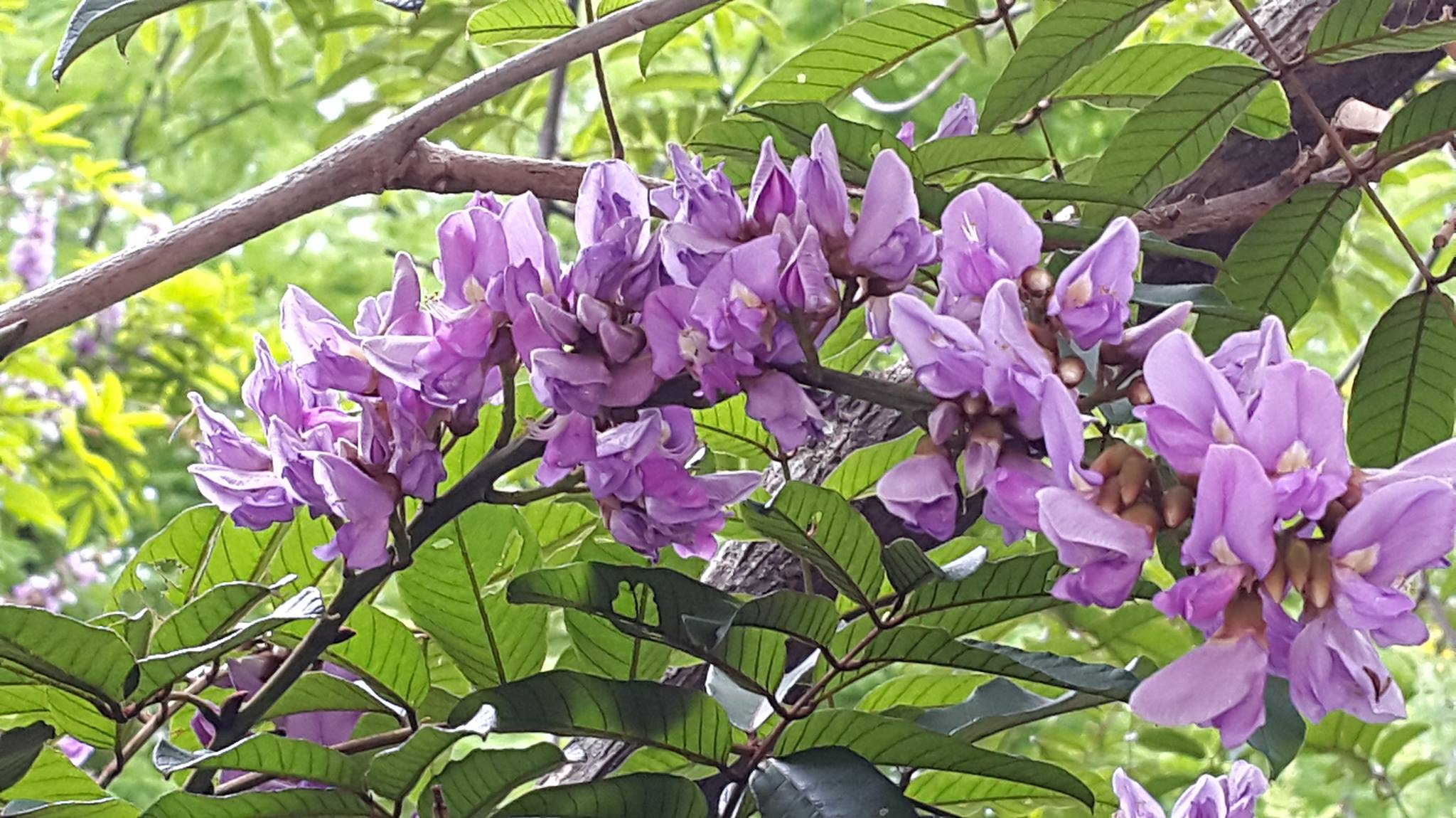
Millettia grandis

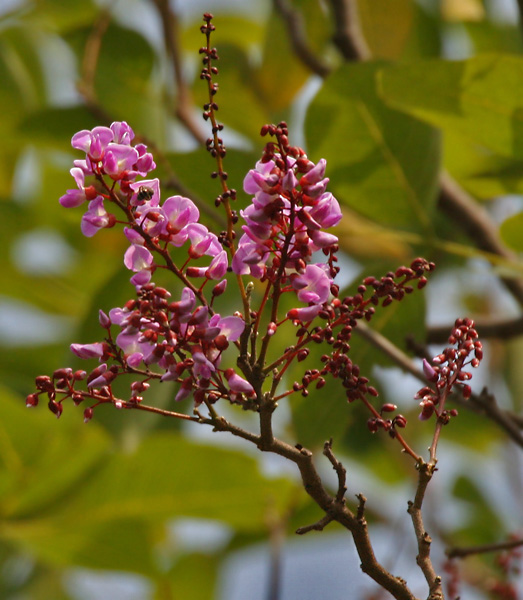
Millettia peguensis

- Millettia aboensis (Hook.) Baker
- Millettia achtenii De Wild.
- Millettia acuticarinata Baker f.
- Millettia ahernii Merr. & Rolfe
- Millettia angustidentata De Wild.
- Millettia angustistipellata De Wild.
- Millettia aromatica Dunn
- Millettia aurea (R.Vig.) Du Puy & Labat
- Millettia austroyunnanensis Y.Y.Qian
- Millettia barteri (Benth.) Dunn
- Millettia bequaertii De Wild.
- Millettia bipindensis Harms
- Millettia borneensis Adema
- Millettia brachycarpa Merr.
- Millettia brandisiana Kurz
- Millettia bussei Harms
- Millettia cabrae De Wild.
- Millettia caerulea Baker
- Millettia cana Benth.
- Millettia capuronii Du Puy & Labat
- Millettia caudata (Benth.) Baker
- Millettia chrysamaryssa Adema
- Millettia chrysophylla Dunn
- Millettia comosa (Micheli) Hauman
- Millettia conraui Harms
- Millettia coruscans Dunn
- Millettia cubittii Dunn
- Millettia densiflora Mattapha, Lanors. & Lamxay
- Millettia dinklagei Harms
- Millettia diptera Gagnep.
- Millettia discolor De Wild.
- Millettia drastica Welw. ex Baker
- Millettia dubia De Wild.
- Millettia duchesnei De Wild.
- Millettia dura Dunn
- Millettia ebenifera (Bertol.) J.E.Burrows & Lötter
- Millettia eetveldeana (Micheli) Hauman
- Millettia elongatistyla J.B.Gillett
- Millettia elskensii De Wild.
- Millettia entadoides Z.Wei
- Millettia eriocarpa Dunn
- Millettia erythrocalyx Gagnep.
- Millettia exauriculata Hauman
- Millettia extensa (Benth.) Benth. ex Baker
- Millettia ferruginea (Hochst.) Hochst. ex Baker
- Millettia fruticosa (DC.) Benth. ex Baker
- Millettia fulgens Dunn
- Millettia galliflagrans Whitmore
- Millettia geerinckiana O.Lachenaud
- Millettia glabra Adema
- Millettia glaucescens Kurz
- Millettia goossensii (Hauman) Polhill
- Millettia gracilis Welw. ex Baker
- Millettia grandis (E.Mey.) Skeels
- Millettia griffithii Dunn
- Millettia griffoniana Baill.
- Millettia harmandii Gagnep.
- Millettia harmsiana De Wild.
- Millettia hedraeantha Harms
- Millettia hitsika Du Puy & Labat
- Millettia hockii De Wild.
- Millettia hylobia Louis ex Hauman
- Millettia hypolampra Harms
- Millettia impressa Harms
- Millettia irvinei Hutch. & Dalziel
- Millettia kangensis Craib
- Millettia kennedyi Hoyle
- Millettia kerrii P.K.Lôc
- Millettia klainei Dunn
- Millettia lacus-alberti J.B.Gillett
- Millettia lane-poolei Dunn
- Millettia laotica Gagnep.
- Millettia lasiantha Dunn
- Millettia lastoursvillensis Pellegr.
- Millettia laurentii De Wild.
- Millettia lebrunii Hauman
- Millettia lecomtei Dunn
- Millettia lenneoides Vatke
- Millettia leonensis Hepper
- Millettia letestui Pellegr.
- Millettia liberica Jongkind
- Millettia limbutuensis De Wild.
- Millettia longipes Perkins
- Millettia lucens (Scott Elliot) Dunn
- Millettia lucida Gagnep.
- Millettia lundensis E.P.Sousa
- Millettia macrophylla Benth.
- Millettia macrostachya Collett & Hemsl.
- Millettia macroura Harms
- Millettia makondensis Harms
- Millettia mannii Baker
- Millettia melanocarpa (Hauman) Adomou
- Millettia merrillii Perkins
- Millettia micans Taub.
- Millettia mildbraedii Harms
- Millettia mossambicensis J.B.Gillett
- Millettia multiflora Collett & Hemsl.
- Millettia nathaliae Du Puy & Labat
- Millettia nepalensis R.Parker
- Millettia nigrescens Gagnep.
- Millettia nudiflora Welw. ex Baker
- Millettia nutans Welw. ex E.P.Sousa
- Millettia nyangensis Pellegr.
- Millettia oblata Dunn
- Millettia oraria (Hance) Dunn
- Millettia orientalis Du Puy & Labat
- Millettia oyemensis Pellegr.
- Millettia pachyloba Drake
- Millettia pallens Stapf
- Millettia paucijuga Harms
- Millettia peguensis Ali
- Millettia penduliformis Gagnep.
- Millettia penicillata Gagnep.
- Millettia phuwuaensis Mattapha & Suddee
- Millettia pilosa Hutch. & Dalziel
- Millettia platyphylla Merr. ex Dunn
- Millettia principis Gagnep.
- Millettia psilopetala Harms
- Millettia pterocarpa Dunn
- Millettia pubinervis Kurz
- Millettia puerarioides Prain
- Millettia puguensis J.B.Gillett
- Millettia pulchra (Voigt) Kurz
- Millettia rhodantha Baill.
- Millettia richardiana (Baill.) Du Puy & Labat
- Millettia rigens (Craib) Niyomdham
- Millettia ripicola E.P.Sousa
- Millettia rubiginosa Wight & Arn.
- Millettia sacleuxii Dunn
- Millettia sanagana Harms
- Millettia sapindifolia T.C.Chen
- Millettia sapinii De Wild.
- Millettia schliebenii Harms
- Millettia semseii J.B.Gillett
- Millettia sericantha Harms
- Millettia sericea (Vent.) Wight & Arn. ex Hassk.
- Millettia solomonensis Verdc.
- Millettia soyauxii Taub.
- Millettia splendens Wight & Arn.
- Millettia stenopetala Hauman
- Millettia stipellatissima Hauman
- Millettia stipulata Dunn
- Millettia stuhlmannii Taub.
- Millettia subpalmata Dunn
- Millettia suddeei Mattapha & Tetsana
- Millettia takou Lorougnon
- Millettia tanaensis J.B.Gillett
- Millettia taolanaroensis Du Puy & Labat
- Millettia tecta (Craib) Mattapha & Chantar.
- Millettia tenuipes Merr.
- Millettia tessmannii Harms
- Millettia tetraptera Kurz
- Millettia theuszii (Büttner) De Wild.
- Millettia thollonii Dunn
- Millettia thonneri De Wild.
- Millettia thonningii (Schumach. & Thonn.) Baker
- Millettia ulbrichiana Harms
- Millettia urophylloides De Wild.
- Millettia usaramensis Taub.
- Millettia vankerckhovenii De Wild.
- Millettia vatkei P.K.Lôc
- Millettia velutina Dunn
- Millettia velvetina Adema
- Millettia versicolor Welw. ex Baker
- Millettia viridiflora O.Lachenaud
- Millettia warneckei Harms
- Millettia wellensii De Wild.
- Millettia wieringae Adomou
- Millettia xylocarpa Miq.
- Millettia zechiana Harms
