= M. aurea =

M. aurea may refer to:

- Millettia aurea, a legume species found only in Madagascar
- Miomantis aurea, a praying mantis species
- Myriopteris aurea, a plant species

== See also ==
- Aurea (disambiguation)
