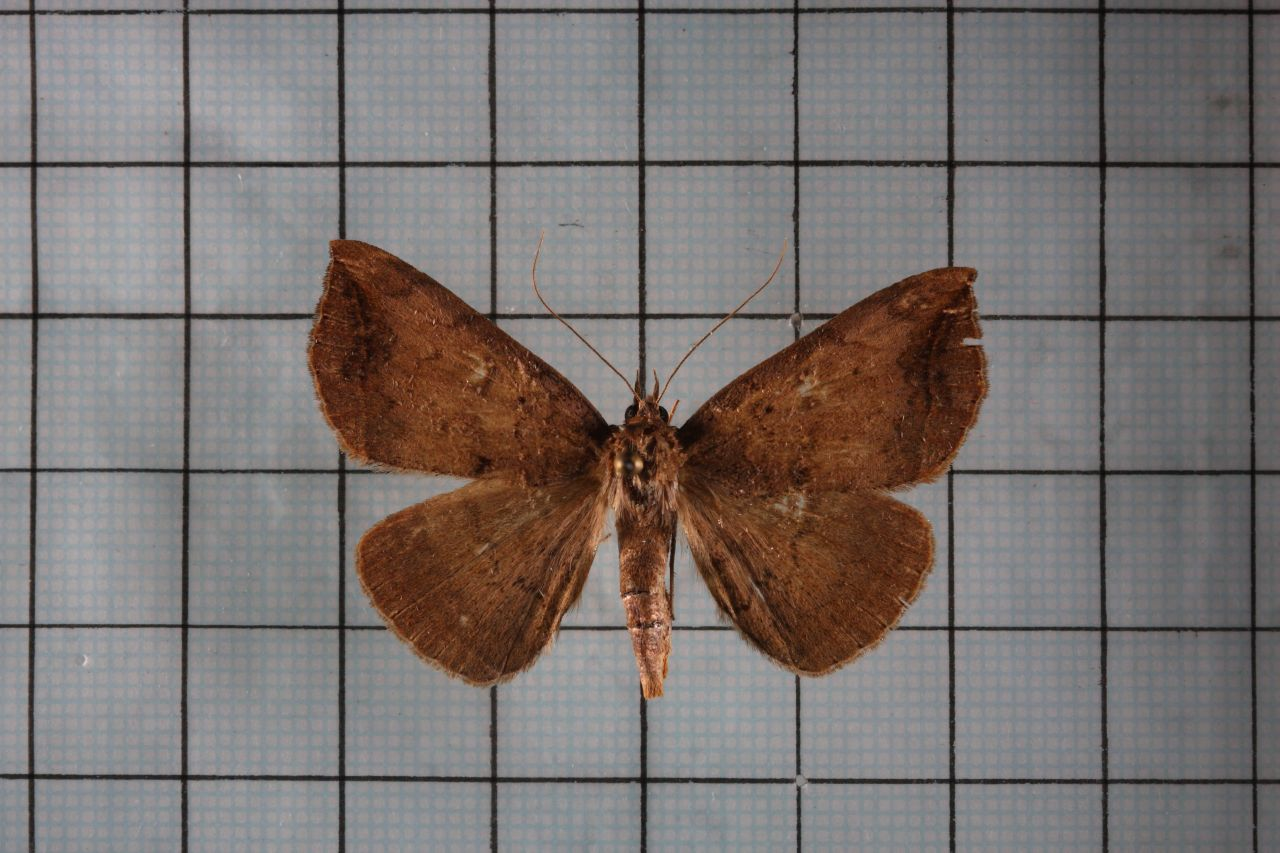

Scientific classification
- Domain: Eukaryota
- Kingdom: Animalia
- Phylum: Arthropoda
- Class: Insecta
- Order: Lepidoptera
- Superfamily: Noctuoidea
- Family: Erebidae
- Genus: Blasticorhinus
- Species: B. ussuriensis

Binomial name
- Blasticorhinus ussuriensis (Bremer, 1861)

Synonyms
- Remigia ussuriensis Bremer, 1861; Azazia unduliger Butler, 1878

= Blasticorhinus ussuriensis =

Species of moth

Blasticorhinus ussuriensis is a moth of the family Erebidae first described by Otto Vasilievich Bremer in 1861. It is found in Taiwan, Korea, Japan and the Russian Far East.

The wingspan is 54–58 mm.

The larvae feed on various woody Leguminosae, including Lespedeza, Millettia, Robinia and Wisteria species.
