= Millettia velvetina =

Conservation status
- Vulnerable (IUCN 2.3)

Scientific classification
- Kingdom: Plantae
- Clade: Tracheophytes
- Clade: Angiosperms
- Clade: Eudicots
- Clade: Rosids
- Order: Fabales
- Family: Fabaceae
- Subfamily: Faboideae
- Genus: Millettia
- Species: M. velvetina

Binomial name
- Millettia velvetina Adema

Synonyms
- Pongamia pinnata var. velutina C.T.White; Pongamia velutina (C.T.White) Verdc.

Species of legume

Millettia velvetina, synonym Pongamia velutina, is a species of legume in the family Fabaceae. It is found only in New Guinea. It is threatened by habitat loss.
