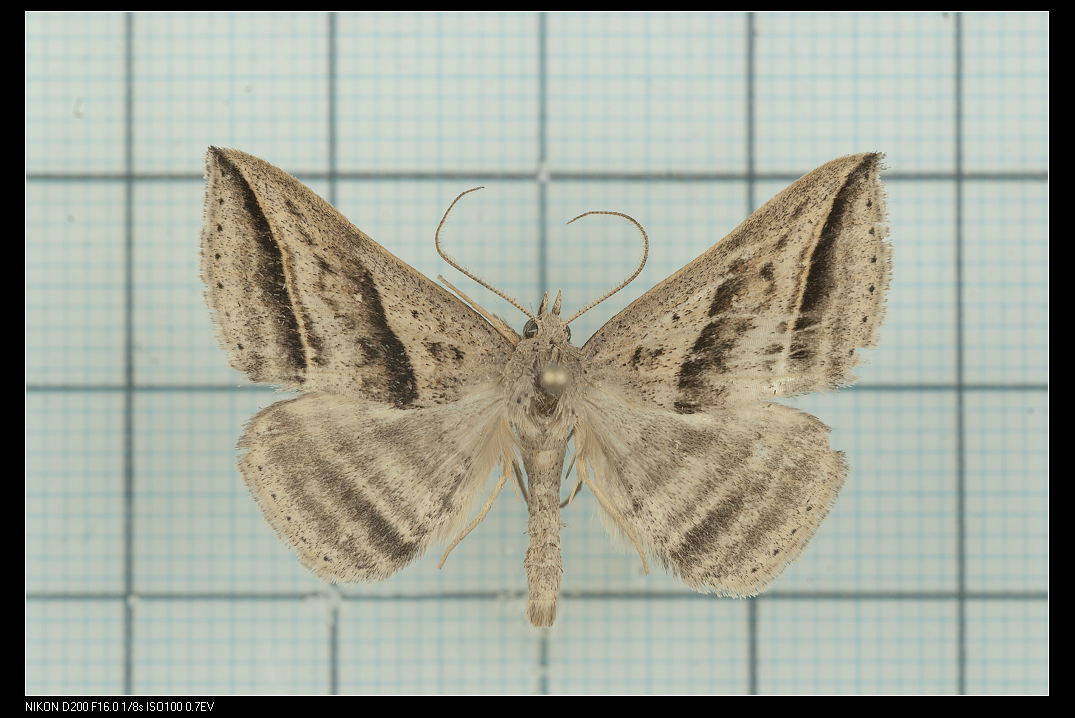

Scientific classification
- Kingdom: Animalia
- Phylum: Arthropoda
- Class: Insecta
- Order: Lepidoptera
- Superfamily: Noctuoidea
- Family: Erebidae
- Genus: Blasticorhinus
- Species: B. bifasciata

Binomial name
- Blasticorhinus bifasciata (Wileman, 1914)

Synonyms
- Thermesia bifasciata Wileman, 1914; Carsina bifasciata

= Blasticorhinus bifasciata =

Species of moth

Blasticorhinus bifasciata is a species of moth in the family Noctuidae. It is found in Taiwan.
