= Rinorea welwitschii =

Conservation status
- Least Concern (IUCN 3.1)

Scientific classification
- Kingdom: Plantae
- Clade: Tracheophytes
- Clade: Angiosperms
- Clade: Eudicots
- Clade: Rosids
- Order: Malpighiales
- Family: Violaceae
- Genus: Rinorea
- Species: R. welwitschii

Binomial name
- Rinorea welwitschii (Oliv.) Kuntze

Synonyms
- Alsodeia welwitschii Oliv.

Species of flowering plant

Rinorea welwitschii is a plant species in the genus Rinorea found in Africa.

The pyranoisoflavone alpinumisoflavone can be found in the bark of R. welwitschii.
