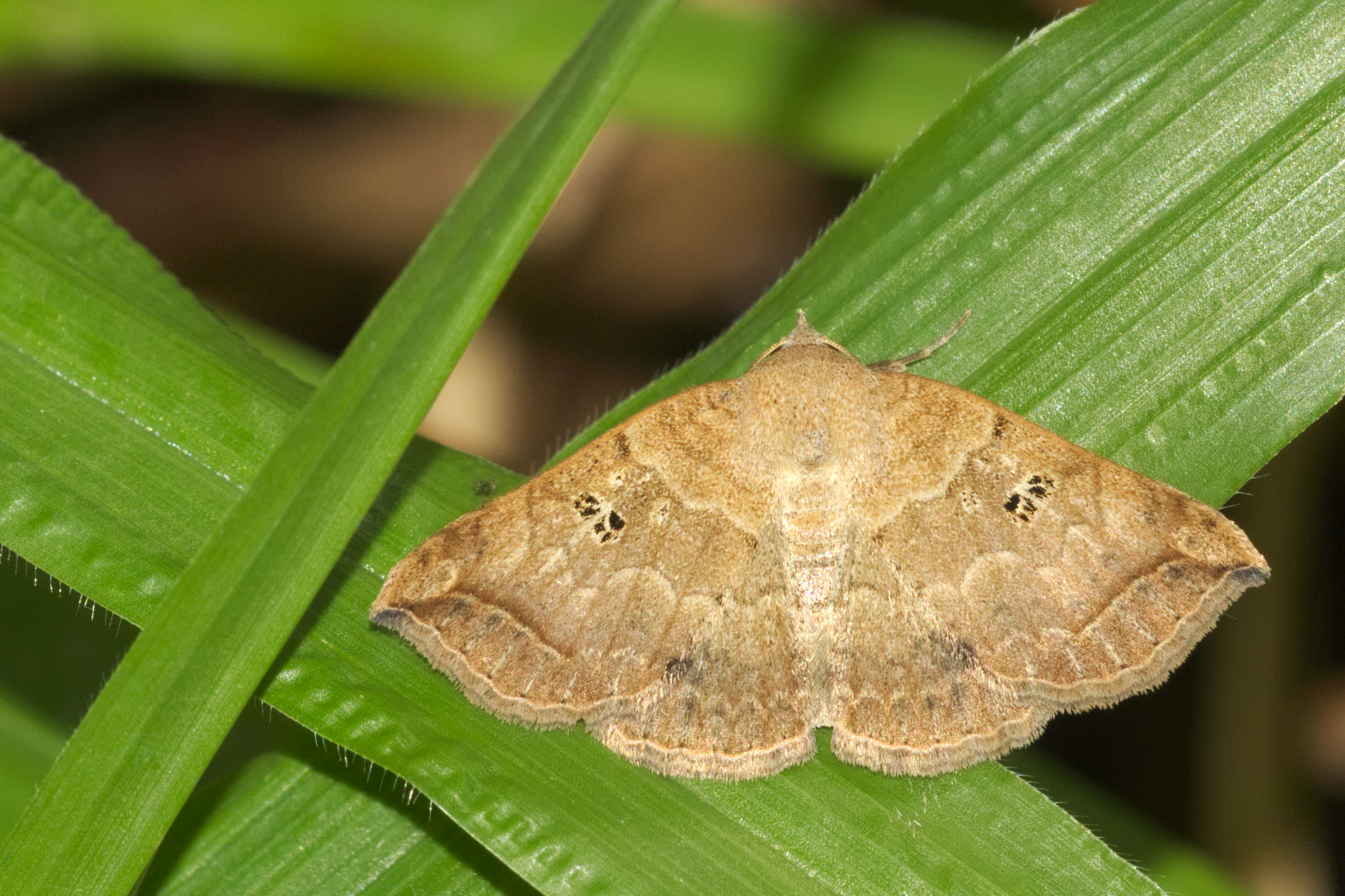

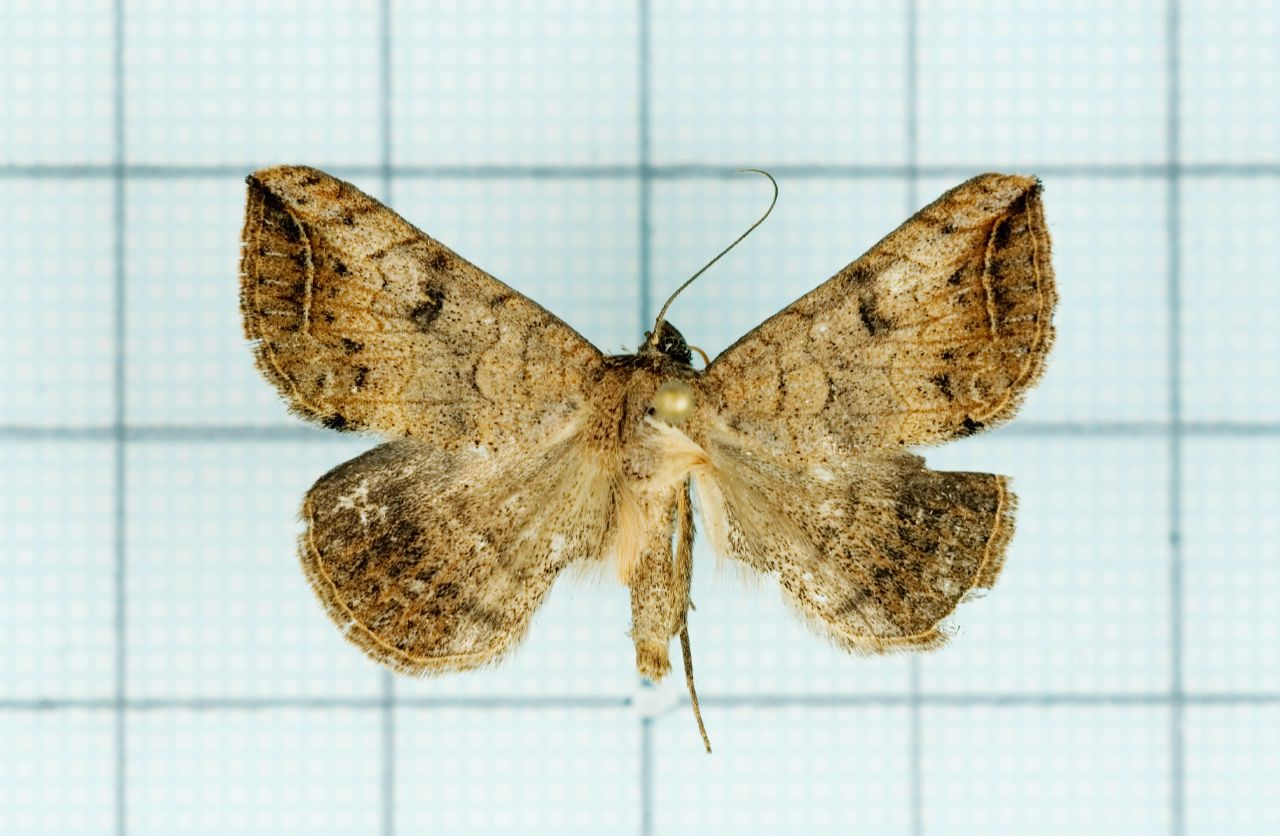

Scientific classification
- Kingdom: Animalia
- Phylum: Arthropoda
- Class: Insecta
- Order: Lepidoptera
- Superfamily: Noctuoidea
- Family: Erebidae
- Genus: Blasticorhinus
- Species: B. rivulosa

Binomial name
- Blasticorhinus rivulosa (Walker, 1865)

Synonyms
- Thermesia rivulosa Walker, 1865; Acantholites quadripuncta Swinhoe, 1902

= Blasticorhinus rivulosa =

Species of moth

Blasticorhinus rivulosa is a moth of the family Noctuidae. It is found in Japan, Taiwan, India and Sri Lanka.

== Description ==
Its wingspan is about 32 mm. Hindwings of male with normal neuration. A large vesicular fold found on base of inner margin with a tuft of long hair attached to it. The apex of the vesicular fold truncate. Female has reddish grey-brown body. Forewings with antemedial sinuous line. A dark spot on discocellulars and specks found at origin of vein 2. There is an irregularly waved postmedial line. A waved sub-marginal line found with fuscous brown area beyond it. A curved fulvous and ochreous line runs from apex to vein 3. Hindwings with sinuous medial line and lunulate postmedial, sub-marginal lines. Outer area fuscous brown. Both wings with fine marginal ochreous line.
