= Alpinumisoflavone =

- Chemical structure of alpinumisoflavone

Names
- IUPAC name 4′,5-Dihydroxy-6′′,6′′-dimethyl-6′′H-pyrano[3′′,2′′:6,7]isoflavone
- Systematic IUPAC name 5-Hydroxy-3-(4-hydroxyphenyl)-8,8-dimethyl-4H,8H-benzo[1,2-b:5,4-b′]dipyran-4-one
- Other names 5-Hydroxy-3-(4-hydroxyphenyl)-8,8-dimethylpyrano[3,2-g]chromen-4-one

Identifiers
CAS Number	34086-50-5
3D model (JSmol)	Interactive image; Interactive image
ChEMBL	ChEMBL238628
ChemSpider	4590280
PubChem CID	5490139
UNII	6Q33HOF94Z
CompTox Dashboard (EPA)	DTXSID00187683
- InChI: InChI=1S/C20H16O5/c1-20(2)8-7-13-15(25-20)9-16-17(18(13)22)19(23)14(10-24-16)11-3-5-12(21)6-4-11/h3-10,21-22H,1-2H3 Key: RQAMSFTXEFSBPK-UHFFFAOYSA-N; InChI=1/C20H16O5/c1-20(2)8-7-13-15(25-20)9-16-17(18(13)22)19(23)14(10-24-16)11-3-5-12(21)6-4-11/h3-10,21-22H,1-2H3 Key: RQAMSFTXEFSBPK-UHFFFAOYAG
- SMILES: CC1(C=CC2=C(O1)C=C3C(=C2O)C(=O)C(=CO3)C4=CC=C(C=C4)O)C; O=C2/C(c1ccc(O)cc1)=C\Oc4c2c(O)c3\C=C/C(Oc3c4)(C)C

Properties
Chemical formula	C_{20}H_{16}O_{5}
Molar mass	336.33 g/mol
- Except where otherwise noted, data are given for materials in their standard state (at 25 °C [77 °F], 100 kPa). verify (what is ?) Infobox references

Alpinumisoflavone is a pyranoisoflavone, a type of isoflavone.

== Properties ==
It can be found in the bark of Rinorea welwitschii. It can also be found in the molluscicide plant Millettia thonningii and is thought to be an antischistosomal agent since it has been shown to kill the snails which transmit the schistosomiasis and also the larvae of the parasite itself.
