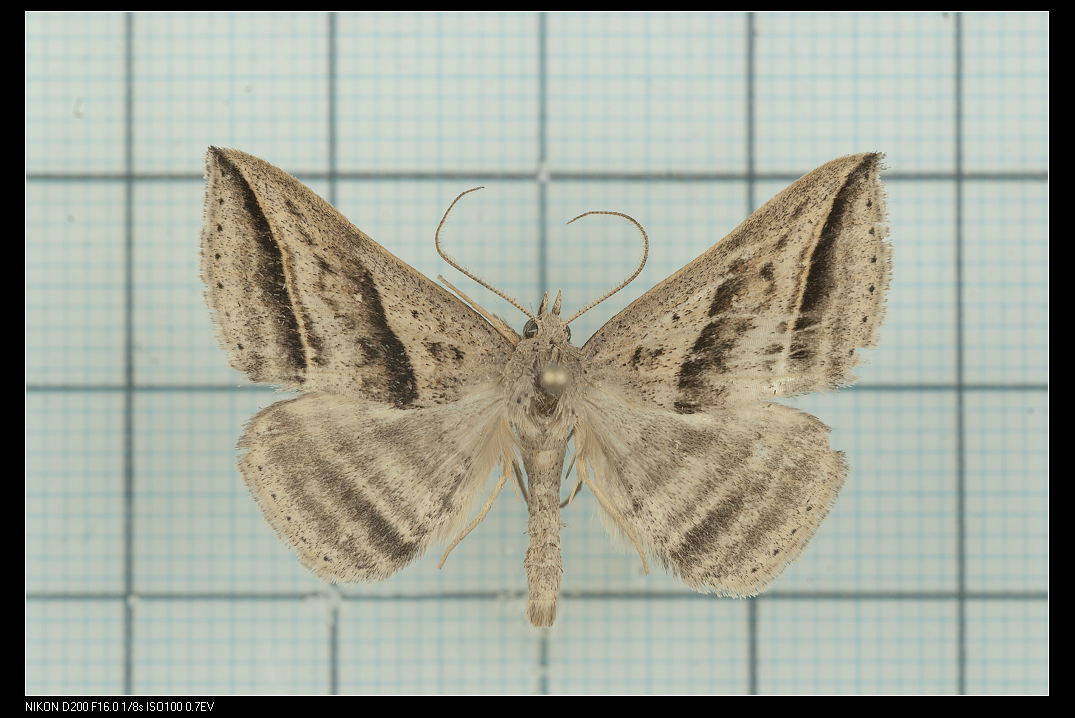
- Blasticorhinus bifasciata

Scientific classification
- Domain: Eukaryota
- Kingdom: Animalia
- Phylum: Arthropoda
- Class: Insecta
- Order: Lepidoptera
- Superfamily: Noctuoidea
- Family: Erebidae
- Subfamily: Calpinae
- Genus: Blasticorhinus; Butler, 1893

= Blasticorhinus =

Genus of moths

Blasticorhinus is a genus of moths of the family Erebidae.

== Selected species ==
- Blasticorhinus aurantiaca (Holland, 1894)
- Blasticorhinus bifasciata (Wileman, 1914)
- Blasticorhinus cymasius Hampson, 1926
- Blasticorhinus decernens (Walker, 1863) (Malaysia, Sulawesi)
- Blasticorhinus discipuncta (Holland, 1894) (Gabon, Sierra Leone)
- Blasticorhinus enervis (Swinhoe, 1890)
- Blasticorhinus epixandus Rothschild, 1920
- Blasticorhinus hampsoni (Bethune-Baker, 1906)
- Blasticorhinus hoenei Berio, 1956
- Blasticorhinus kanshireiensis (Wileman, 1914)
- Blasticorhinus otophora (Hampson, 1894)
- Blasticorhinus oxydata (Swinhoe, 1895)
- Blasticorhinus rivulosa (Walker, 1865) (Japan, India)
- Blasticorhinus trichopoda Hampson, 1926 (Cameroon, Ghana, Sierra Leone)
- Blasticorhinus ussuriensis (Bremer, 1861) (Siberia, Korea, Japan, China, Taiwan)
- Blasticorhinus waelbroecki (Strand, 1918)
