= Millettia extensa =

Scientific classification
- Kingdom: Plantae
- Clade: Tracheophytes
- Clade: Angiosperms
- Clade: Eudicots
- Clade: Rosids
- Order: Fabales
- Family: Fabaceae
- Subfamily: Faboideae
- Genus: Millettia
- Species: M. extensa

Binomial name
- Millettia extensa (Benth.) Benth. ex Baker

Synonyms
- List: Amerimnon pallidum Buch.-Ham. ex Baker; Millettia auriculata Baker; Millettia macrophylla (Benth.) Kurz; Otosema extensa Benth.; Otosema macrophylla Benth.; Phaseoloides extensum (Benth.) Kuntze; Pongamia macrophylla (Wall.) Ralph; Robinia macrophylla Roxb.; Tephrosia macrophylla Wall.

Species of plant in the genus Millettia

Millettia extensa is a species of flowering plant in the family Fabaceae, native to the Indian Subcontinent and Southeast Asia. A woody climber, local peoples use it as a supplemental forage and for various veterinary treatments for their livestock.
