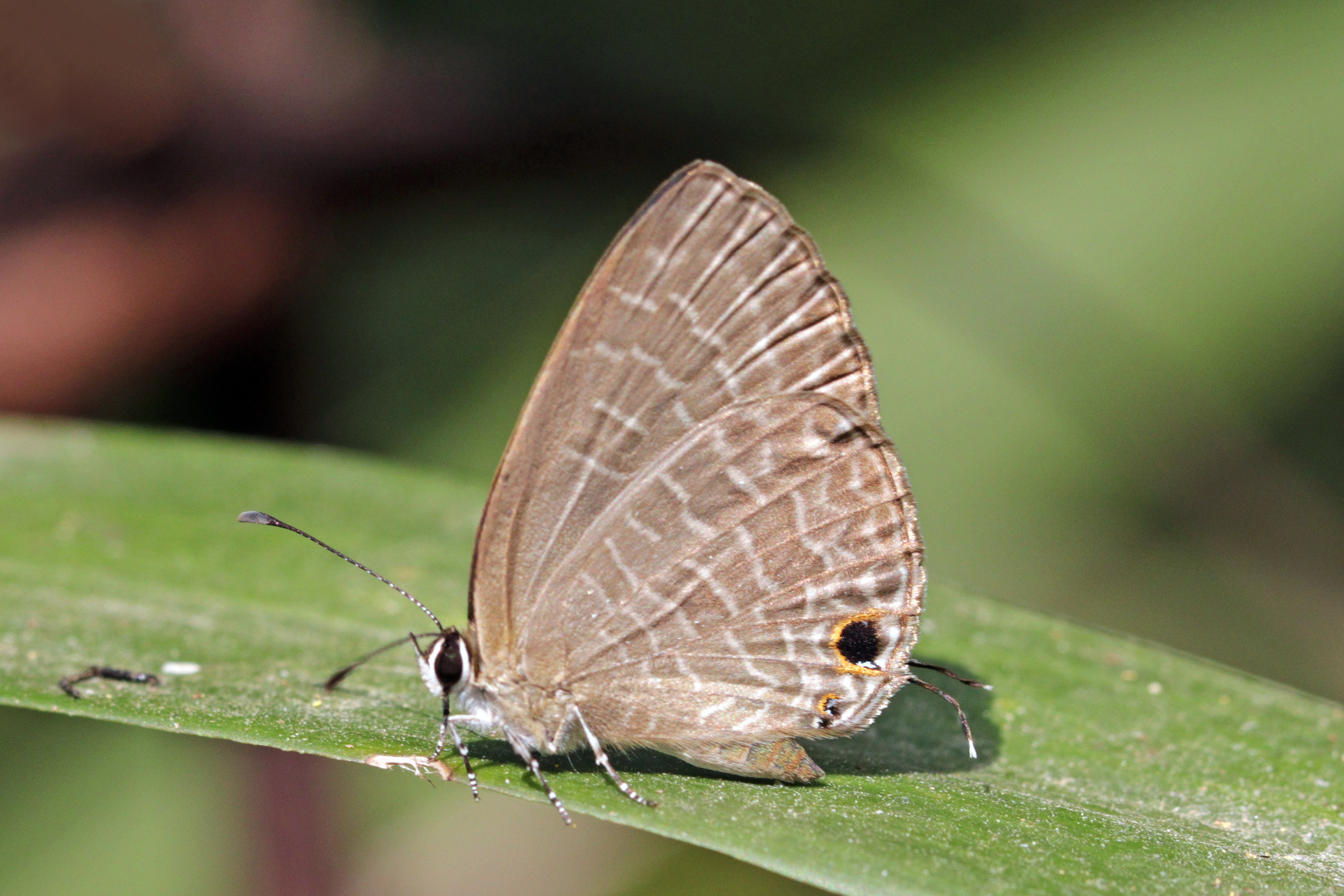
- J. b. bochus, Nepal
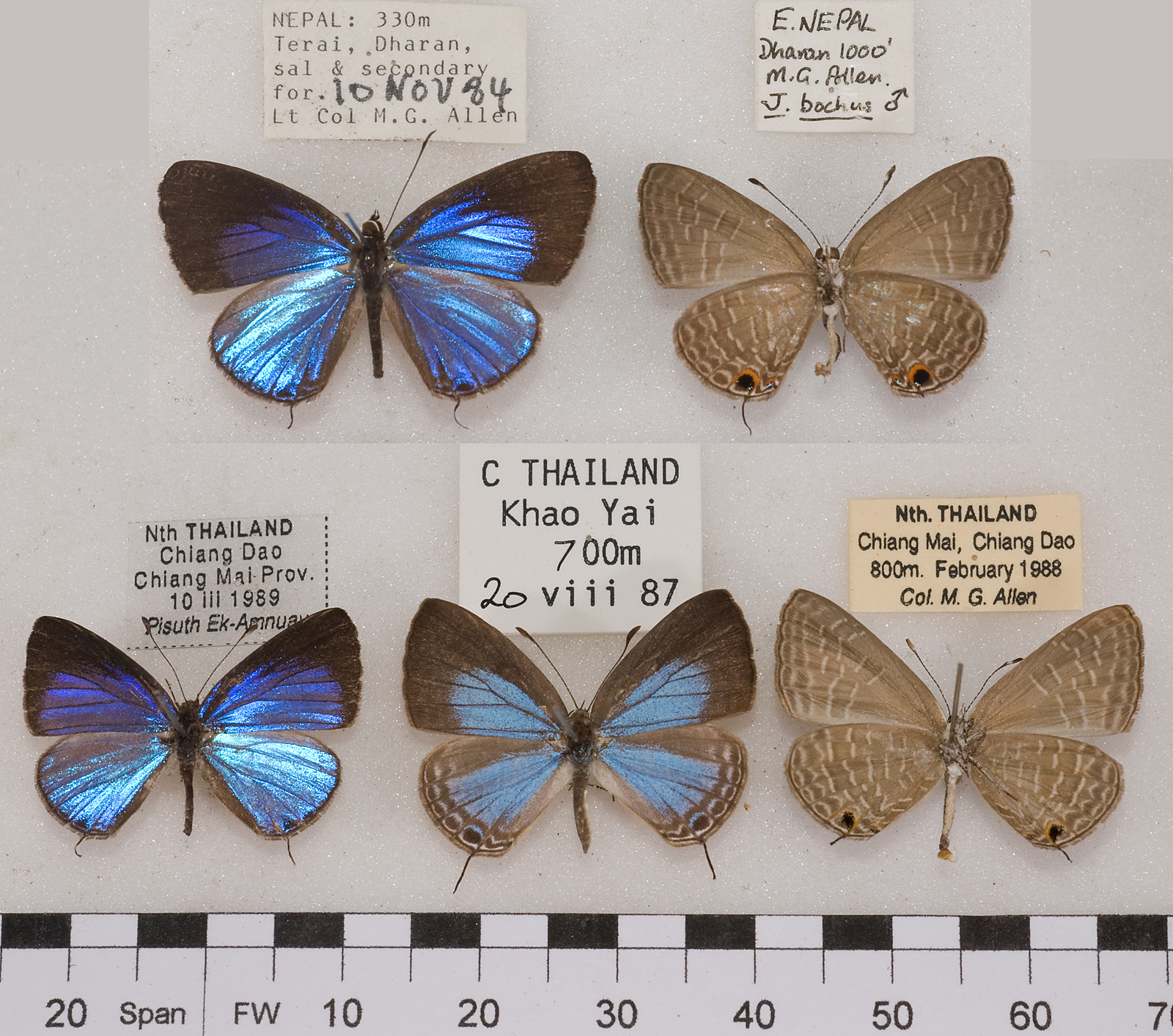

Scientific classification
- Kingdom: Animalia
- Phylum: Arthropoda
- Class: Insecta
- Order: Lepidoptera
- Family: Lycaenidae
- Genus: Jamides
- Species: J. bochus

Binomial name
- Jamides bochus Stoll 1782

= Jamides bochus =

Species of butterfly

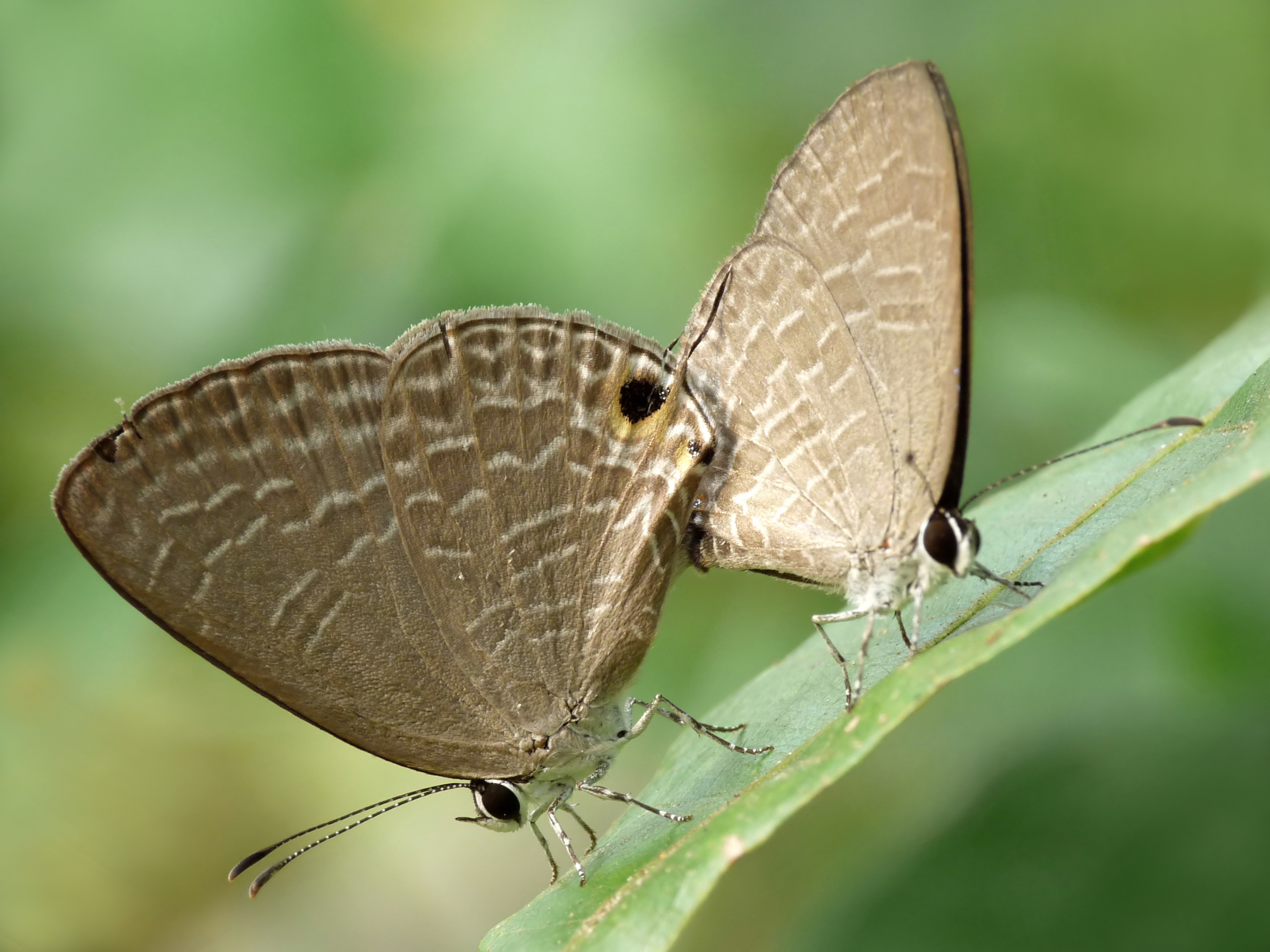
Mating pair

Jamides bochus, the dark cerulean, is a small butterfly found in Indomalayan realm that belongs to the lycaenids or blues family. The species was first described by Caspar Stoll in 1782.

== Description ==
Male upperside, forewing: velvety jet black; base deep blue, beautifully metallic and shining, measured on the dorsum this colour occupies three-fourths of its length from base, its outer margin then curves upwards just past the apex of the cell, enters into the bases of interspaces 10, 11 and 12 and fills the whole of the cell. Hindwing: costal margin above subcostal vein and vein 7, and dorsal margin narrowly fuscous black, a medial longitudinal pale streak on the former; terminal margin narrowly edged with velvety black, inside which in interspaces 1 and 2 is a slender transverse whitish line, with an elongate irregular transverse black spot above it in interspace 1 and a more obscure similar spot in interspace 2; traces of such spots also are present in some specimens in the anterior interspaces. Cilia of both forewings and hindwings black; filamentous tail at apex of vein 2 black tipped with white. Underside: dark chocolate brown. Forewings and hindwings; transversely crossed by the following very slender white hues all more or less broken into short pieces: Forewing: a short pair one on each side of and parallel to the discocellulars, a pale streak along the discocellulars themselves; a single line in continuation of the outer of the discocellular lines, extends down to vein 1; an upper discal pair of lines that form a more or less catenulated (chain-like) short band extend from the costa to vein 3, the inner line of the two continued to vein 1; two more obscure subterminal and a single terminal line, the area enclosed between the subterminal lines and between them and the terminal line darker in the interspaces, giving the appearance of two obscure subterminal lines of spots edged inwardly and outwardly by white lines. Hindwing: crossed by nine very broken and irregular lines; tracing them from the costa downwards their middle short pieces are found to be shifted outwards and a few are short and not complete, the inner two are posteriorly bent abruptly upwards, the subterminal two are lunular and the terminal line nearly continuous; posteriorly between the subterminal pair of lines in interspace 1 there is a small black spot inwardly edged with dark ochraceous, and in interspace 2a much larger round black spot, both black spots are touched with metallic blue scales. Antennae, head, thorax and abdomen black, the shafts of the antennae speckled with white; beneath: palpi, thorax and abdomen narrowly white down the middle.

Female. Similar to the male generally but with the following differences: upperside, forewing: ground colour fuscous opaque black, not velvety black, blue basal area more restricted and not so deep a blue nor at all metallic. Hindwing: the black costal and terminal margins very much broader, the blue on the basal area consequently much restricted and of the same shade as the blue on the forewing; terminal margin with a subterminal anteriorly obsolescent series of spots of a shade darker than that of the terminal black area on which they are superposed; these spots posteriorly more or less distinctly encircled with slender lines of bluish white, anteriorly these lines are almost obsolete. Cilia of both forewings and hindwings and the filamentous short tail as in the male. Underside: similar to that of the cf but the ground colour generally paler and duller; the transverse white lines broader and more dearly defined. Antenna, head, thorax and abdomen as in the male.

== Distribution ==
Peninsular India, but not in the very dry or desert tracts; Sri Lanka, Assam, Nepal, Myanmar, Tenasserim, the Andamans; extending in the Malayan subregion to Australia and Taiwan.

== Life cycle ==
"The larva which we have taken at Karwar in June is hardly distinguishable from that of Catochrysops pandava, Horsfield; it is, however, covered with minute hairs and is generally of an olive-green colour and without the reddish suffusion so generally noticed in C. pandava. The pupa is indistinguishable from that of C. pandava. The larva feeds on Xylia dolabrifornis, and also on the flowers of Butea frondosa." Other food plants noted include Millettia peguensis.

== Gallery ==
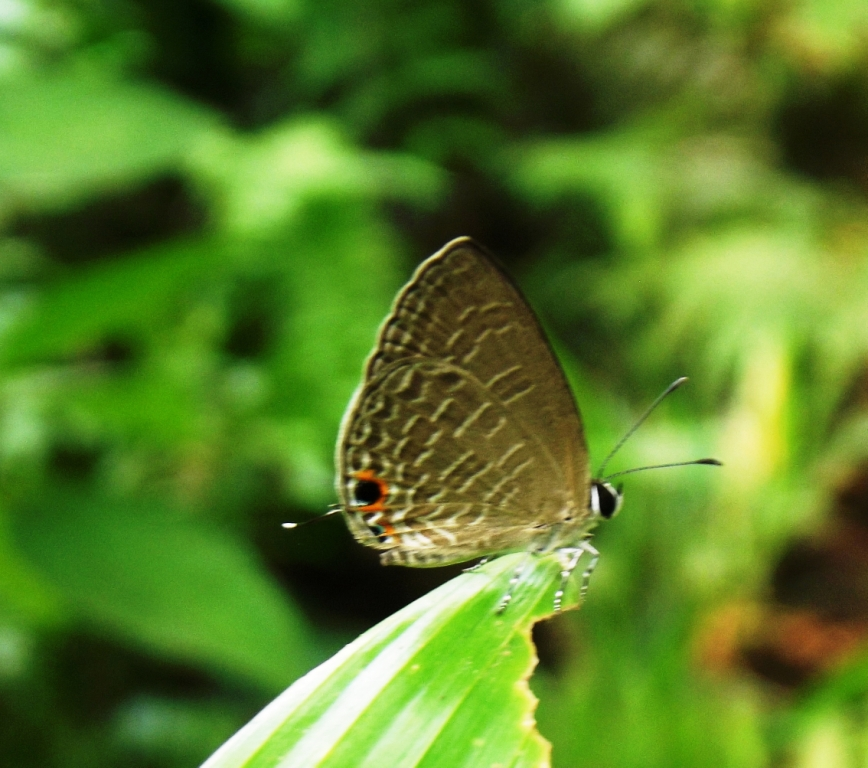
At Kozhikode, Kerala, India

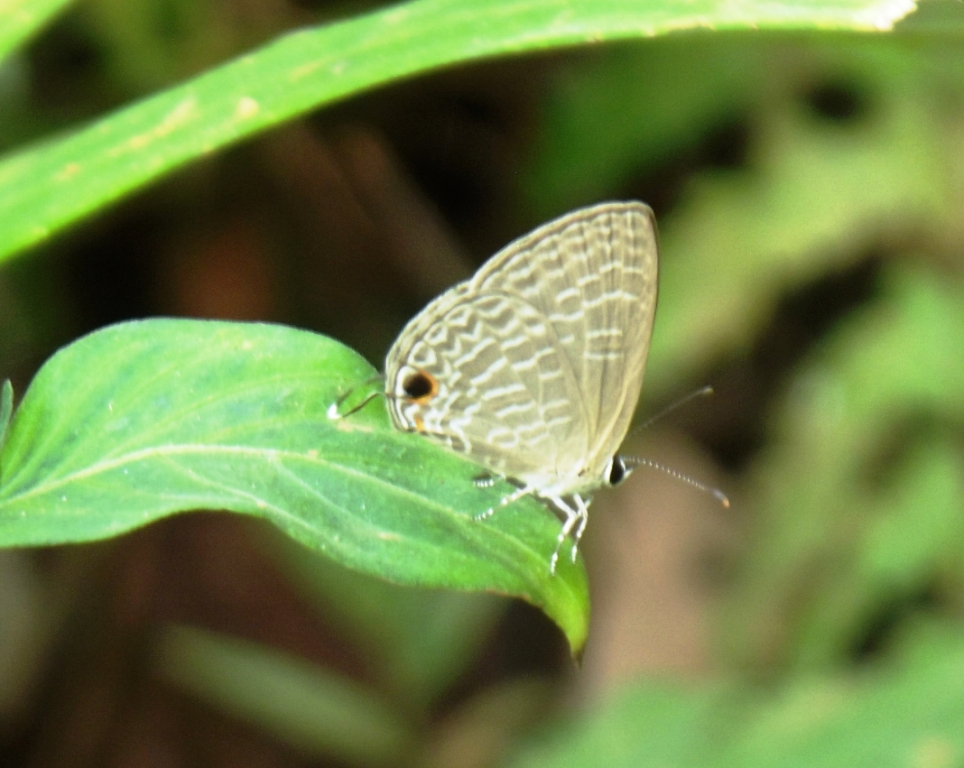
At Kozhikode, Kerala

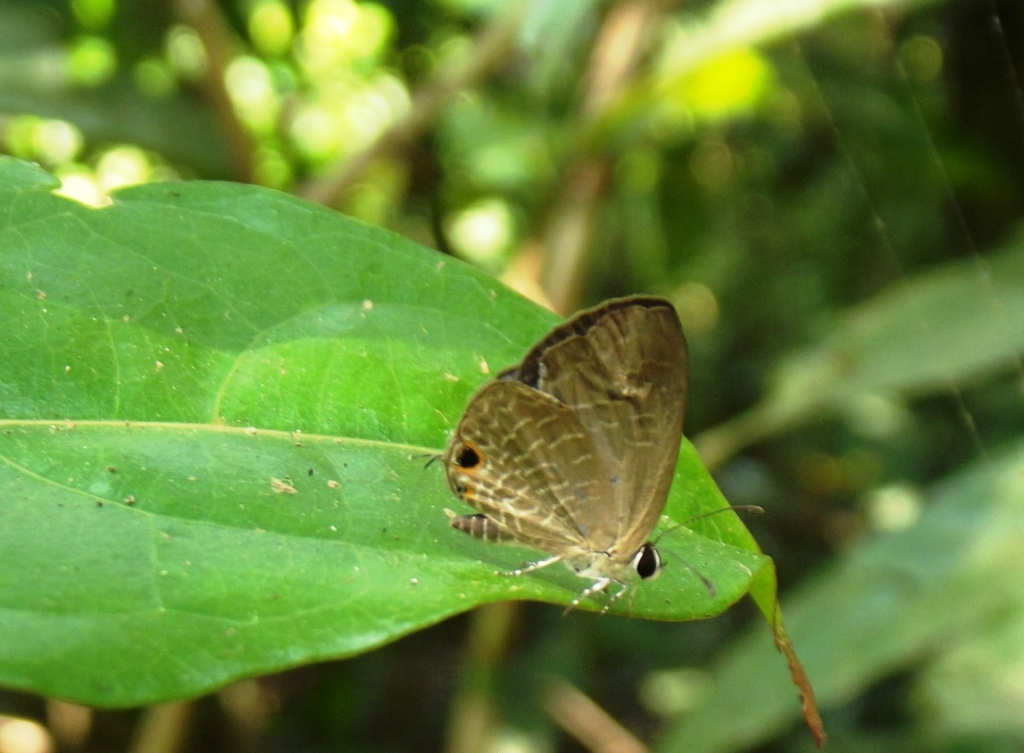
At Kozhikode, Kerala

== See also ==
- List of butterflies of India
- List of butterflies of India (Lycaenidae)
