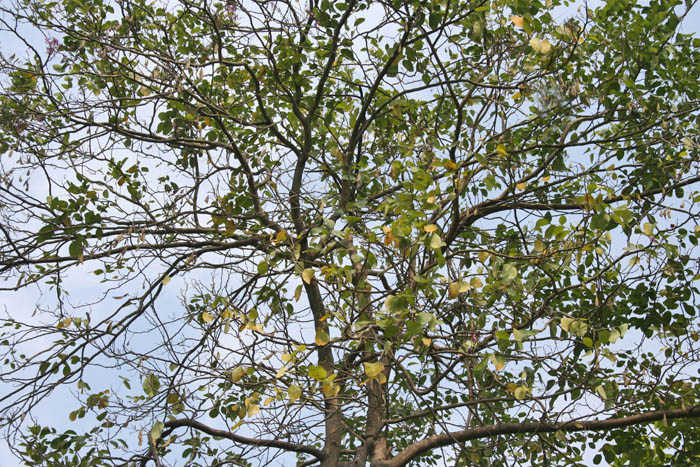
- Tree in Kolkata, West Bengal, India

Scientific classification
- Kingdom: Plantae
- Clade: Tracheophytes
- Clade: Angiosperms
- Clade: Eudicots
- Clade: Rosids
- Order: Fabales
- Family: Fabaceae
- Subfamily: Faboideae
- Genus: Millettia
- Species: M. peguensis

Binomial name
- Millettia peguensis Ali

Synonyms
- Pongamia ovalifolia Millettia ovalifolia

= Millettia peguensis =

Species of legume

Millettia peguensis, the Moulmein rosewood (Bengali: তূমা Tuma), is a legume tree species in the genus Millettia. It is native to Lower Burma and Siam. This is a relatively rare tree as compared to pongam (Pongamia pinnata) that is very similar looking, but more common in India. Pongam has white flowers while the Milletia flowers are bright pink. Pongam has more elongated tip to leaves, while those of M. peguensis are more oval. The plant is a food source for the Jamides bochus caterpillar.

No medicinal or other uses are reported for this plant but the common name Moulmein rosewood suggests that its timber is probably hard, heavy and as useful as some of other rosewoods. The tree is easily propagated in Delhi but it is not very well known in other tropical countries.

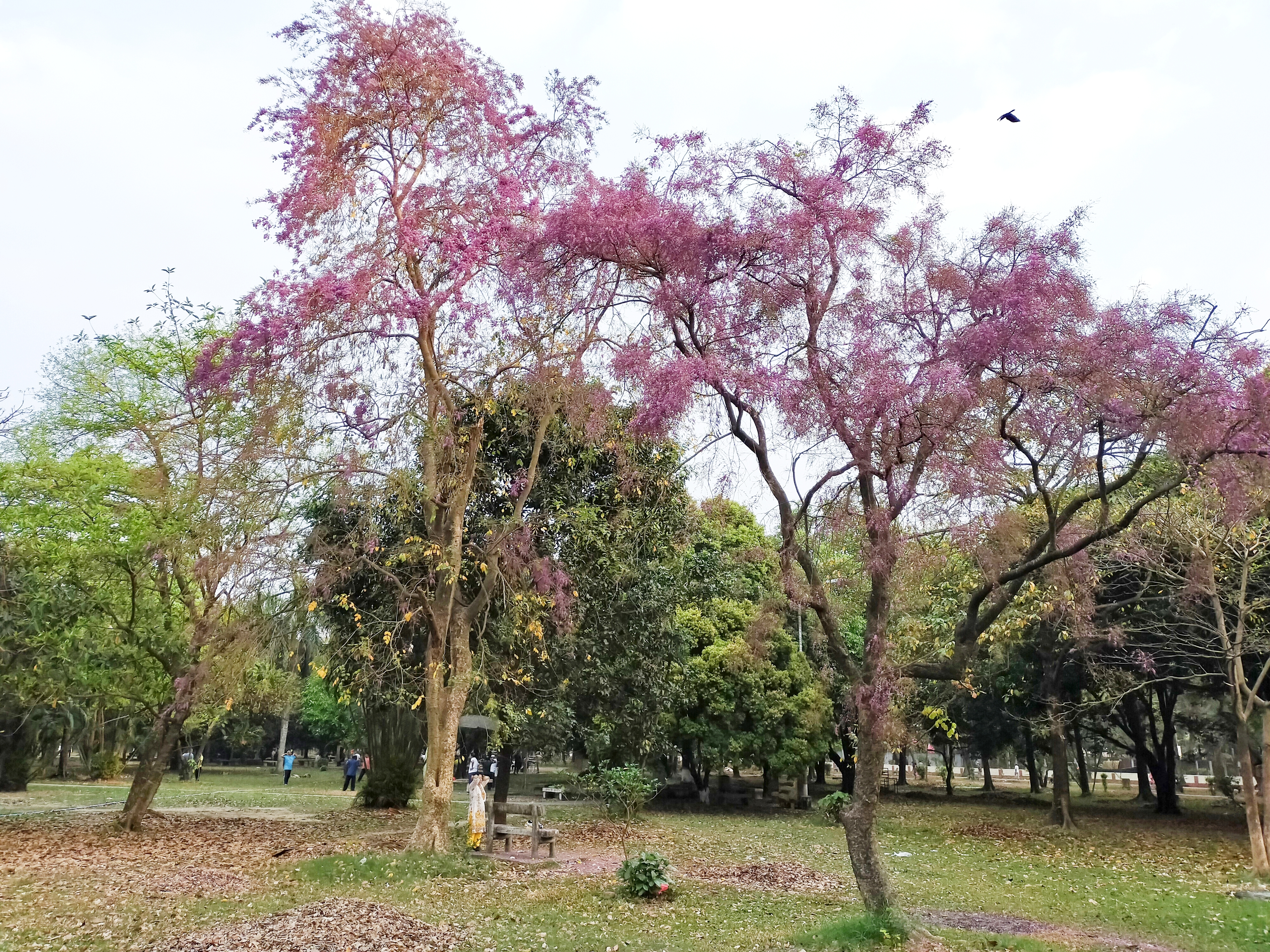
Millettia peguensis with pink-purple small flower in March 2020. Ramna Park, Dhaka
