= Millettia capuronii =

Conservation status
- Vulnerable (IUCN 3.1)

Scientific classification
- Kingdom: Plantae
- Clade: Tracheophytes
- Clade: Angiosperms
- Clade: Eudicots
- Clade: Rosids
- Order: Fabales
- Family: Fabaceae
- Subfamily: Faboideae
- Genus: Millettia
- Species: M. capuronii

Binomial name
- Millettia capuronii Du Puy & Labat

Species of legume

Millettia capuronii is a species of plant in the family Fabaceae. It is found only in Madagascar.

The Latin specific epithet of capuronii is in honor of the French botanist René Capuron. It was first published in Novon Vol.5 on page 171 in 1995.
