= Millettia rhodantha =

Scientific classification
- Kingdom: Plantae
- Clade: Tracheophytes
- Clade: Angiosperms
- Clade: Eudicots
- Clade: Rosids
- Order: Fabales
- Family: Fabaceae
- Subfamily: Faboideae
- Genus: Millettia
- Species: M. rhodantha

Binomial name
- Millettia rhodantha Baill.

Species of legume

Millettia rhodantha is a plant species as described by Henri Ernest Baillon, found in Angola. A synonym to it is Millettia aromatica.

Millettia rhodantha is included in the genus Millettia in the family Fabaceae.

It grows to a height of 9 to 15 metres (30 to 49 ft). No subspecies are listed in the Catalogue of Life.
