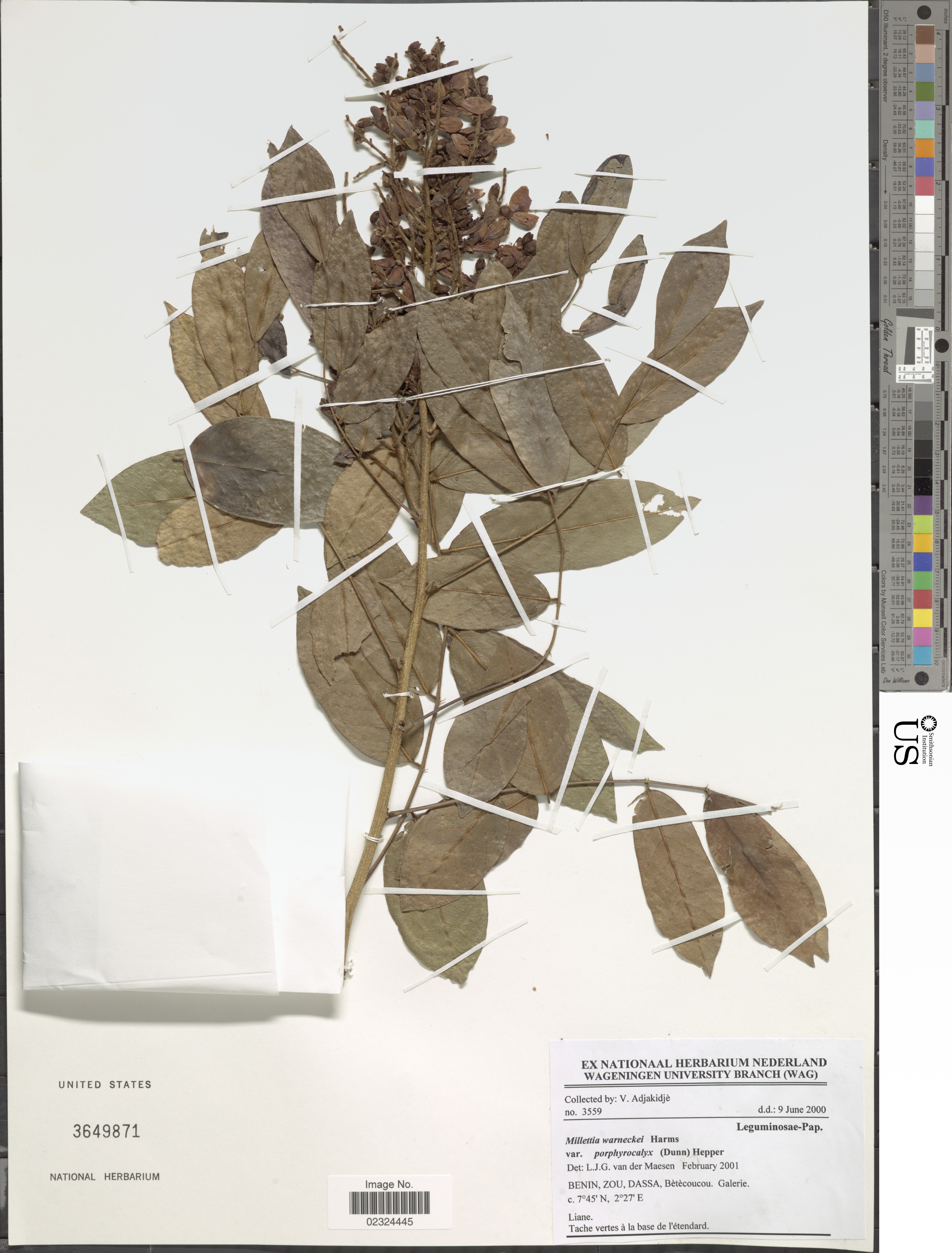

Conservation status
- Vulnerable (IUCN 2.3)

Scientific classification
- Kingdom: Plantae
- Clade: Tracheophytes
- Clade: Angiosperms
- Clade: Eudicots
- Clade: Rosids
- Order: Fabales
- Family: Fabaceae
- Subfamily: Faboideae
- Genus: Millettia
- Species: M. warneckei

Binomial name
- Millettia warneckei Harms

= Millettia warneckei =

Species of legume

Millettia warneckei is a species of plant in the family Fabaceae. It is found in Ghana, Guinea, Liberia, Sierra Leone, and Togo. It is threatened by habitat loss.
