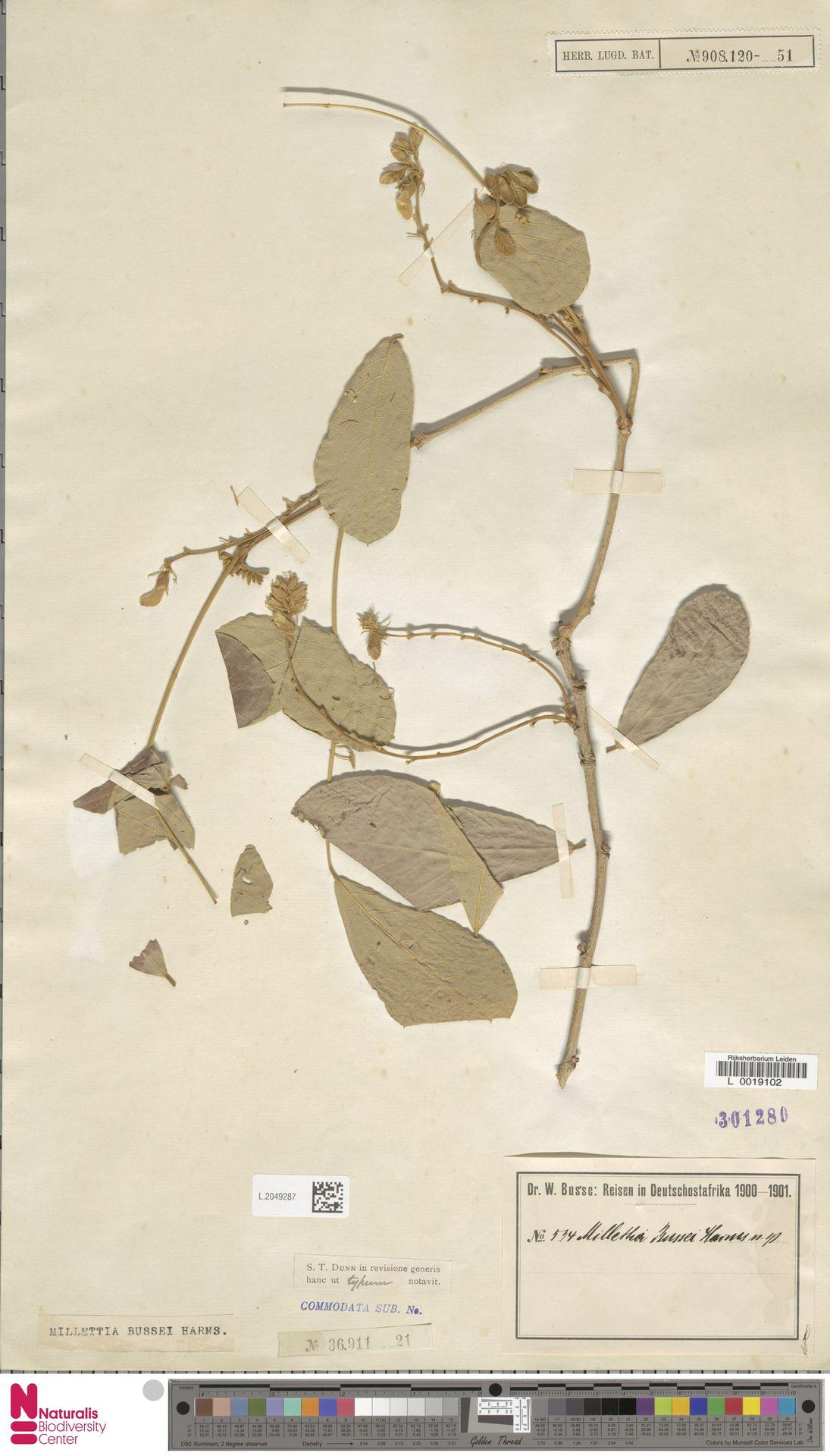

Conservation status
- Least Concern (IUCN 3.1)

Scientific classification
- Kingdom: Plantae
- Clade: Tracheophytes
- Clade: Angiosperms
- Clade: Eudicots
- Clade: Rosids
- Order: Fabales
- Family: Fabaceae
- Subfamily: Faboideae
- Genus: Millettia
- Species: M. bussei

Binomial name
- Millettia bussei Harms

= Millettia bussei =

Species of legume

Millettia bussei is a species of plant in the family Fabaceae. It is found in Mozambique and Tanzania.
