= Millettia elongatistyla =

Conservation status
- Vulnerable (IUCN 2.3)

Scientific classification
- Kingdom: Plantae
- Clade: Tracheophytes
- Clade: Angiosperms
- Clade: Eudicots
- Clade: Rosids
- Order: Fabales
- Family: Fabaceae
- Subfamily: Faboideae
- Genus: Millettia
- Species: M. elongatistyla

Binomial name
- Millettia elongatistyla J.B.Gillett

Species of legume

Millettia elongatistyla is a species of legume in the family Fabaceae. It is found only in Tanzania.
