= Millettia usaramensis =

Scientific classification
- Kingdom: Plantae
- Clade: Tracheophytes
- Clade: Angiosperms
- Clade: Eudicots
- Clade: Rosids
- Order: Fabales
- Family: Fabaceae
- Subfamily: Faboideae
- Genus: Millettia
- Species: M. usaramensis

Binomial name
- Millettia usaramensis Taub

Species of plant

Millettia usaramensis is a tree or shrub belonging to the family Fabaceae. It has two known subspescies namely, Millettia usaramensis subsp. australis and ''Millettia usaramensis subsp. usaramensis.

== Description ==
The species that can grow up to 10 m in height but commonly about 7 m in height, the bark is greyish in color. Leaves have about 4-8 pairs of opposite leaflets with a terminal leaflet; leaflets are 2–7 cm long and 1.5-3.5 cm wide with a glabrous surface below, blade is lanceolate to ovate. Flowers are mauve to purple while the fruit is an oblong pod.

== Chemistry ==
Compounds from the chemical class, rotenoids have been isolated from the leaves and stem bark extracts of the species. The compound, Barbigerone has been isolated from root extracts of the plant.

== Uses ==
Root extracts of the plant are traditionally used as an antidotes for snake bites.
