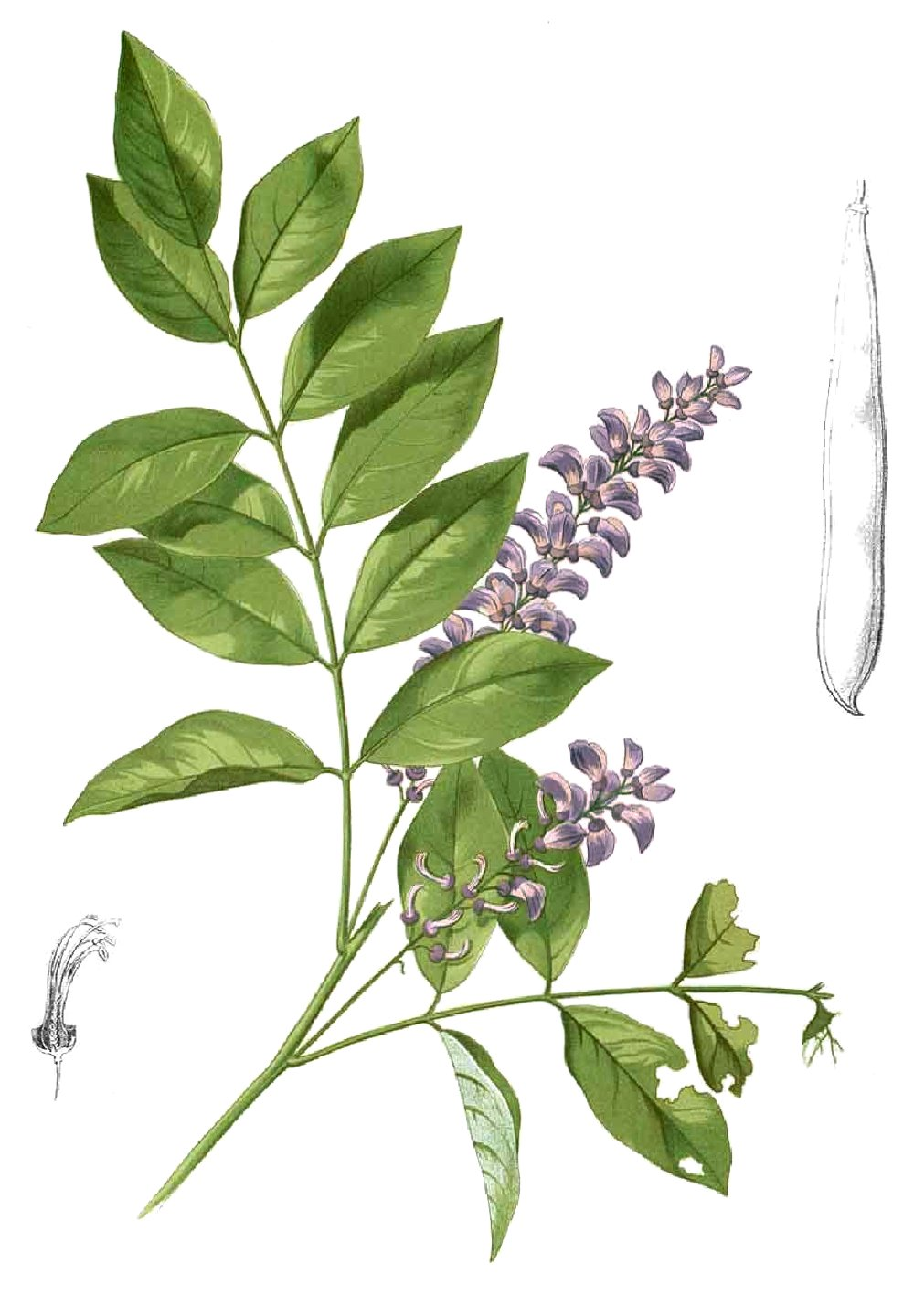

Conservation status
- Vulnerable (IUCN 2.3)

Scientific classification
- Kingdom: Plantae
- Clade: Tracheophytes
- Clade: Angiosperms
- Clade: Eudicots
- Clade: Rosids
- Order: Fabales
- Family: Fabaceae
- Subfamily: Faboideae
- Genus: Millettia
- Species: M. xylocarpa

Binomial name
- Millettia xylocarpa Miq. (1855)

Synonyms
- Millettia decipiens Prain (1897); Millettia dehiscens (Koord. & Valeton) Prain (1897); Millettia fallax Craib (1927); Millettia hemsleyana Prain (1897); Millettia nana Gagnep. (1913); Millettia wrightiana Prain (1897); Phaseoloides xylocarpum Kuntze (1891); Pongamia dehiscens Koord. & Valeton (1895)

= Millettia xylocarpa =

Species of legume

Millettia xylocarpa is a species of plant in the family Fabaceae. It is a tree native to Indochina, Peninsular Malaysia, Sumatra, Java, Borneo, and the Philippines. It is threatened by habitat loss.
