= Millettia orientalis =

Conservation status
- Near Threatened (IUCN 3.1)

Scientific classification
- Kingdom: Plantae
- Clade: Tracheophytes
- Clade: Angiosperms
- Clade: Eudicots
- Clade: Rosids
- Order: Fabales
- Family: Fabaceae
- Subfamily: Faboideae
- Genus: Millettia
- Species: M. orientalis

Binomial name
- Millettia orientalis Du Puy & Labat

Species of legume

Millettia orientalis is a species of plant in the family Fabaceae. It is found only in Madagascar.
