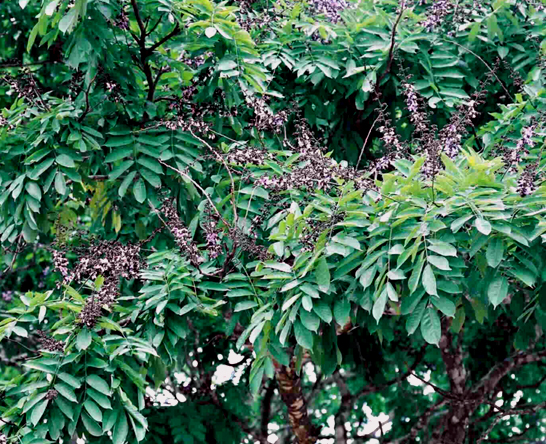
- Tree in flower
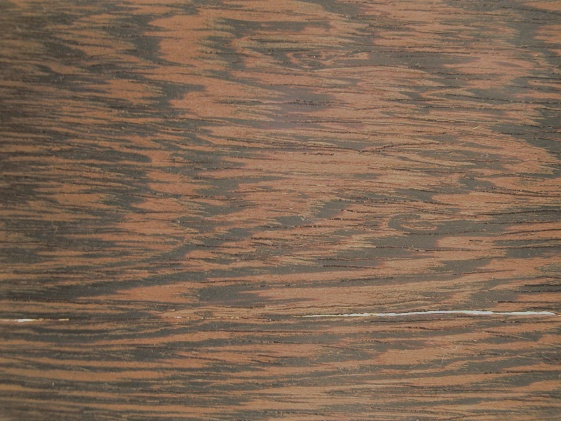
- Tangentially-sawn wood

Conservation status
- Endangered (IUCN 2.3)

Scientific classification
- Kingdom: Plantae
- Clade: Tracheophytes
- Clade: Angiosperms
- Clade: Eudicots
- Clade: Rosids
- Order: Fabales
- Family: Fabaceae
- Subfamily: Faboideae
- Genus: Millettia
- Species: M. laurentii

Binomial name
- Millettia laurentii De Wild.

= Millettia laurentii =

Species of legume

Wenge

Color coordinates
- Hex triplet: #645452
- sRGB^{B} (r, g, b): (100, 84, 82)
- HSV (h, s, v): (7°, 18%, 39%)
- CIELCh_{uv} (L, C, h): (37, 10, 20°)
- B: Normalized to [0–255] (byte)

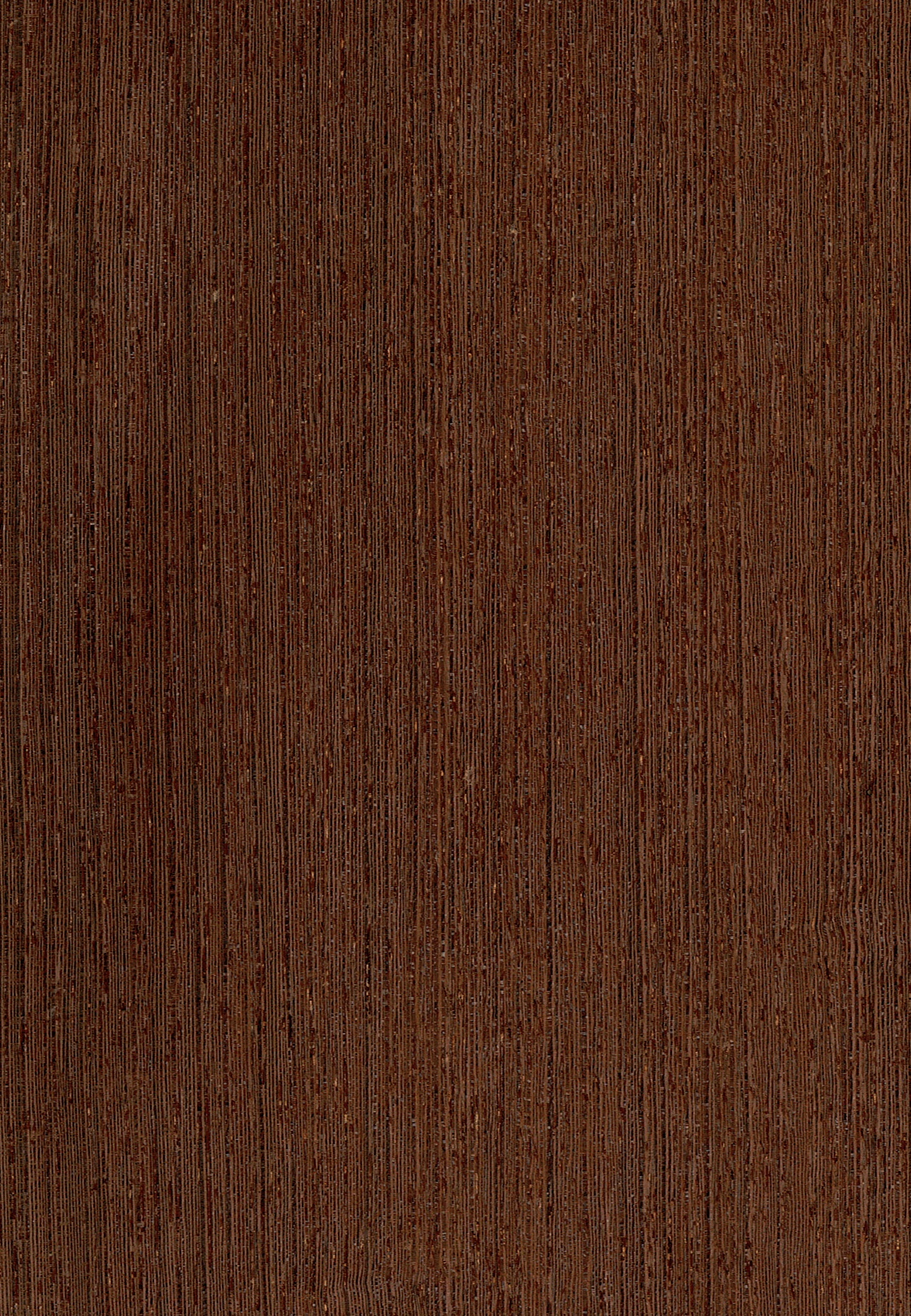
Quartersawn surface

Millettia laurentii is a legume tree from Africa and is native to the Republic of Congo, the Democratic Republic of Congo, Cameroon, Gabon and Equatorial Guinea. The species is listed as "endangered" in the IUCN Red List, principally due to the destruction of its habitat and over-exploitation for timber. Wenge, a dark coloured wood, is the product of Millettia laurentii. Other names sometimes used for wenge include faux ebony, dikela, mibotu, bokonge, awong, and Chinese jichi wood (鸡翅木). The wood's distinctive colour is standardised as a "wenge" colour in many systems.

== Wood ==
Wenge (/ˈwɛŋɡeɪ/ WENG-gay) is a tropical timber, very dark in colour with a distinctive figure and pattern. Rated at approximately 1,930 pounds-force (8,580 N) on the Janka hardness scale, the wood is heavy and hard, suitable for flooring and staircases.

Several musical instrument makers employ wenge in their products. Mosrite used it for bodies of their Brass Rail models. Ibanez and Cort use it for the five-piece necks of some of their electric basses. Warwick electric basses used FSC sourced wenge for fingerboards and necks as of 2013. It is also used by Yamaha as the centre ply of their Absolute Hybrid Maple drums.

The wood is popular in segmented woodturning because of its dimensional stability and colour contrast when mixed with lighter woods such as maple. This makes it especially sought after in the manufacture of high-end wood canes and chess boards.

The wood is sometimes used in the making of archery bows, particularly as a laminate in the production of flatbows. It can also be used in the making of rails or pin blocks on hammered dulcimers.

Solid jichi wood (Millettia laurentii) handle on a traditional Chinese taijijian, showing its characteristic feather-like grain paired with a brass Bagua guard

In China, Millettia laurentii timber is classified under the national hongmu (rosewood) standard (GB/T 18107) as feizhou jichimu (非洲鸡翅木, African jichi wood, lit. "chicken-wing wood"), named for the alternating dark and light tangential growth rings that resemble bird plumage when polished. Because solid jichi wood combines high Janka hardness with low seasonal moisture movement, it is traditionally carved into one-piece handles (剑柄, jianbing) and scabbards (剑鞘, jianqiao) for Chinese double-edged straight swords (jian), particularly practice taijijian used in tai chi training, where dimensional stability keeps the scabbard from warping, rattling in dry winter air, or binding against the steel blade in humid summer climates.

The wood may also be used for kendamas. Though a ken could be made entirely out of wenge, it is generally used to substitute a portion of the big/small cups while the rest of the ken is made out of a softer, less dense wood. This concentration of weight in the big and/or small cup facilitates balance tricks such as lunars.

== Health hazards ==
The dust produced when cutting or sanding wenge can cause dermatitis similar to the effects of poison ivy and is an irritant to the eyes. The dust also can cause respiratory problems and drowsiness. Splinters are septic, similar to those of greenheart (the wood of Chlorocardium rodiei).

== See also ==
- Millettia stuhlmannii
- Millettia leucantha
