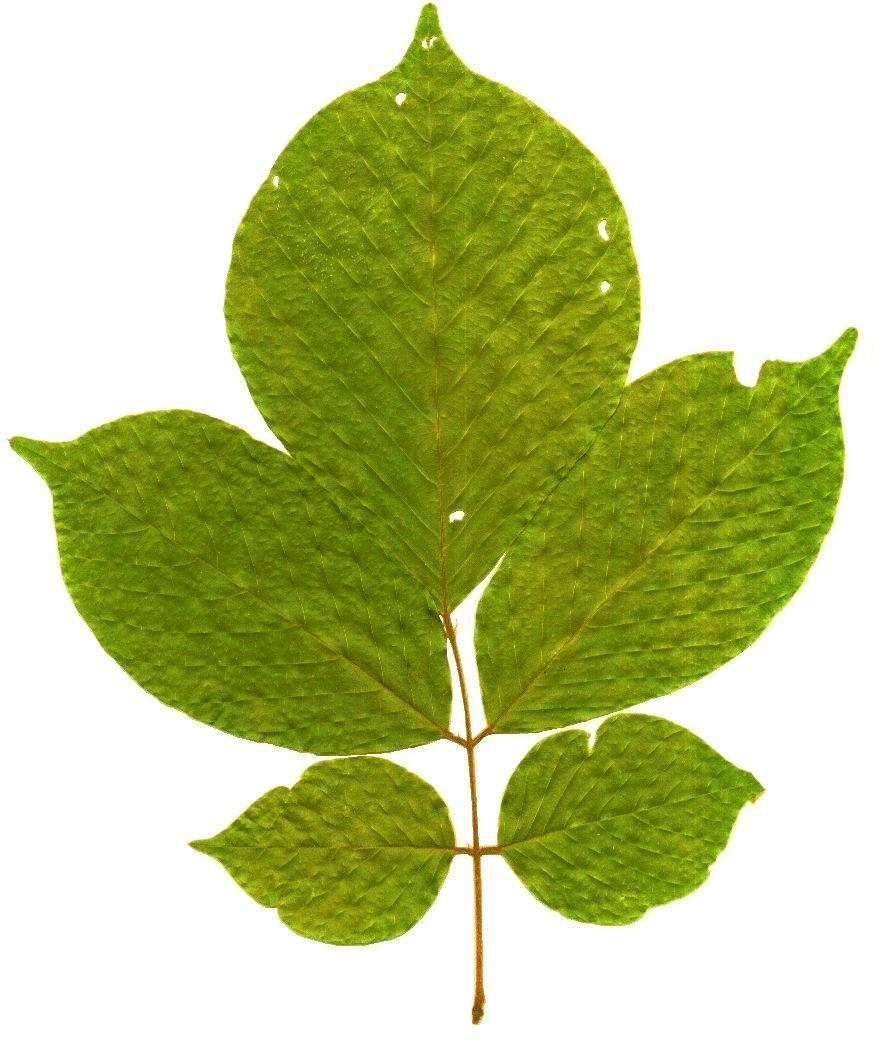
- Upper side of compound leaf

Conservation status
- Least Concern (IUCN 3.1)

Scientific classification
- Kingdom: Plantae
- Clade: Tracheophytes
- Clade: Angiosperms
- Clade: Eudicots
- Clade: Rosids
- Order: Fabales
- Family: Fabaceae
- Subfamily: Faboideae
- Genus: Millettia
- Species: M. mossambicensis

Binomial name
- Millettia mossambicensis J.B.Gillett

= Millettia mossambicensis =

Species of legume

Millettia mossambicensis is a species of plant in the family Fabaceae. It is endemic to central Mozambique, where it is fairly widespread in the low-lying woodlands and forests. The small trees are over-exploited for local construction purposes.

The leaves have two or three pairs of leaflets and one terminal leaflet which is largest. Leaflets have 9 to 11 pairs of lateral, parallel veins. The purple-blue flowers are carried on racemes which appear in spring.

== See also ==
- Southern Zanzibar-Inhambane coastal forest mosaic
