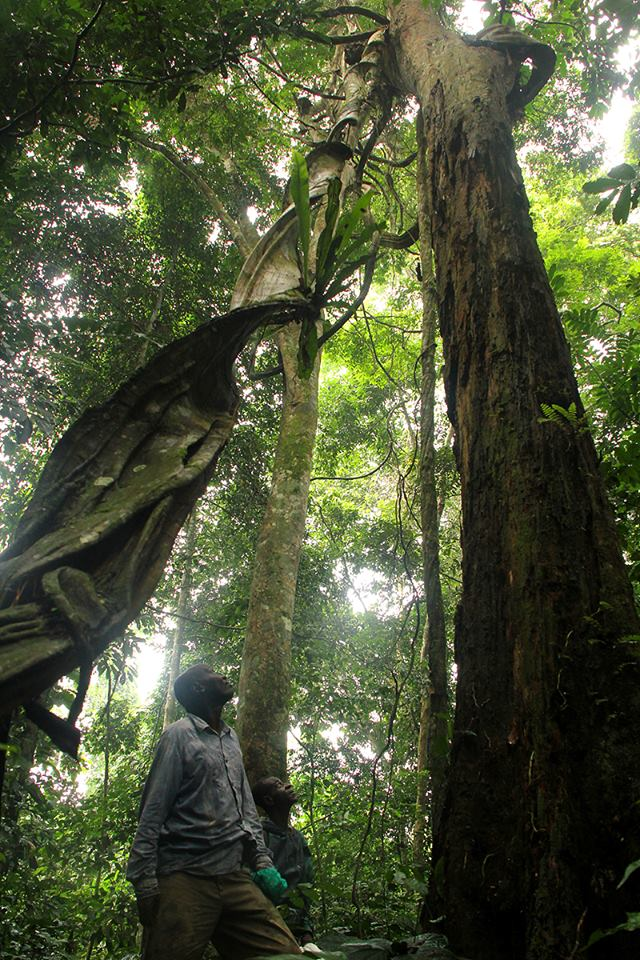

Scientific classification
- Kingdom: Plantae
- Clade: Tracheophytes
- Clade: Angiosperms
- Clade: Eudicots
- Clade: Rosids
- Order: Fabales
- Family: Fabaceae
- Subfamily: Faboideae
- Genus: Millettia
- Species: M. duchesnei

Binomial name
- Millettia duchesnei De Wild.

= Millettia duchesnei =

Species of legume

Millettia duchesnei is a large forest liana in the genus Millettia.

The rotenoids elliptol, 12-deoxo-12alpha-methoxyelliptone, 6-methoxy-6a,12a-dehydrodeguelin, 6a,12a-dehydrodeguelin, 6-hydroxy-6a,12a-dehydrodeguelin, 6-oxo-6a,12a-dehydrodeguelin, 12a-hydroxyelliptone and the flavanone eriodictyol can be isolated from the twigs of M. duchesnei.
