= Millettia pterocarpa =

Conservation status
- Vulnerable (IUCN 2.3)

Scientific classification
- Kingdom: Plantae
- Clade: Tracheophytes
- Clade: Angiosperms
- Clade: Eudicots
- Clade: Rosids
- Order: Fabales
- Family: Fabaceae
- Subfamily: Faboideae
- Genus: Millettia
- Species: M. pterocarpa

Binomial name
- Millettia pterocarpa Dunn

Species of legume

Millettia pterocarpa is a species of plant in the family Fabaceae. It is a tree endemic to Peninsular Malaysia.
