= Millettia lacus-alberti =

Conservation status
- Vulnerable (IUCN 2.3)

Scientific classification
- Kingdom: Plantae
- Clade: Tracheophytes
- Clade: Angiosperms
- Clade: Eudicots
- Clade: Rosids
- Order: Fabales
- Family: Fabaceae
- Subfamily: Faboideae
- Genus: Millettia
- Species: M. lacus-alberti

Binomial name
- Millettia lacus-alberti Gillett

Species of legume

Millettia lacus-alberti is a species of plant in the family Fabaceae. It is found in Democratic Republic of the Congo and Uganda.
