= Millettia semseii =

Conservation status
- Vulnerable (IUCN 2.3)

Scientific classification
- Kingdom: Plantae
- Clade: Tracheophytes
- Clade: Angiosperms
- Clade: Eudicots
- Clade: Rosids
- Order: Fabales
- Family: Fabaceae
- Subfamily: Faboideae
- Genus: Millettia
- Species: M. semseii

Binomial name
- Millettia semseii J.B.Gillett

Species of legume

Millettia semseii is a species of legume in the family Fabaceae. It is endemic to Tanzania. It has been assessed as "vulnerable" in the IUCN Red List.
