= Millettia conraui =

Conservation status
- Endangered (IUCN 3.1)

Scientific classification
- Kingdom: Plantae
- Clade: Tracheophytes
- Clade: Angiosperms
- Clade: Eudicots
- Clade: Rosids
- Order: Fabales
- Family: Fabaceae
- Subfamily: Faboideae
- Genus: Millettia
- Species: M. conraui

Binomial name
- Millettia conraui Harms

Species of legume

Millettia conraui is a species of plant in the family Fabaceae. It is found in Cameroon and Nigeria. It is threatened by habitat loss.
