= Millettia psilopetala =

Conservation status
- Least Concern (IUCN 2.3)

Scientific classification
- Kingdom: Plantae
- Clade: Tracheophytes
- Clade: Angiosperms
- Clade: Eudicots
- Clade: Rosids
- Order: Fabales
- Family: Fabaceae
- Subfamily: Faboideae
- Genus: Millettia
- Species: M. psilopetala

Binomial name
- Millettia psilopetala Harms

Species of legume

Millettia psilopetala is a species of legume in the family Fabaceae. It is found in Democratic Republic of the Congo and Uganda.
