= Millettia macrophylla =

Conservation status
- Near Threatened (IUCN 3.1)

Scientific classification
- Kingdom: Plantae
- Clade: Tracheophytes
- Clade: Angiosperms
- Clade: Eudicots
- Clade: Rosids
- Order: Fabales
- Family: Fabaceae
- Subfamily: Faboideae
- Genus: Millettia
- Species: M. macrophylla

Binomial name
- Millettia macrophylla Benth.

Species of legume

Millettia macrophylla is a species of plant in the family Fabaceae. It is found in Cameroon, Equatorial Guinea, and Nigeria. Its natural habitat is subtropical or tropical moist lowland forests. It is threatened by habitat loss.
