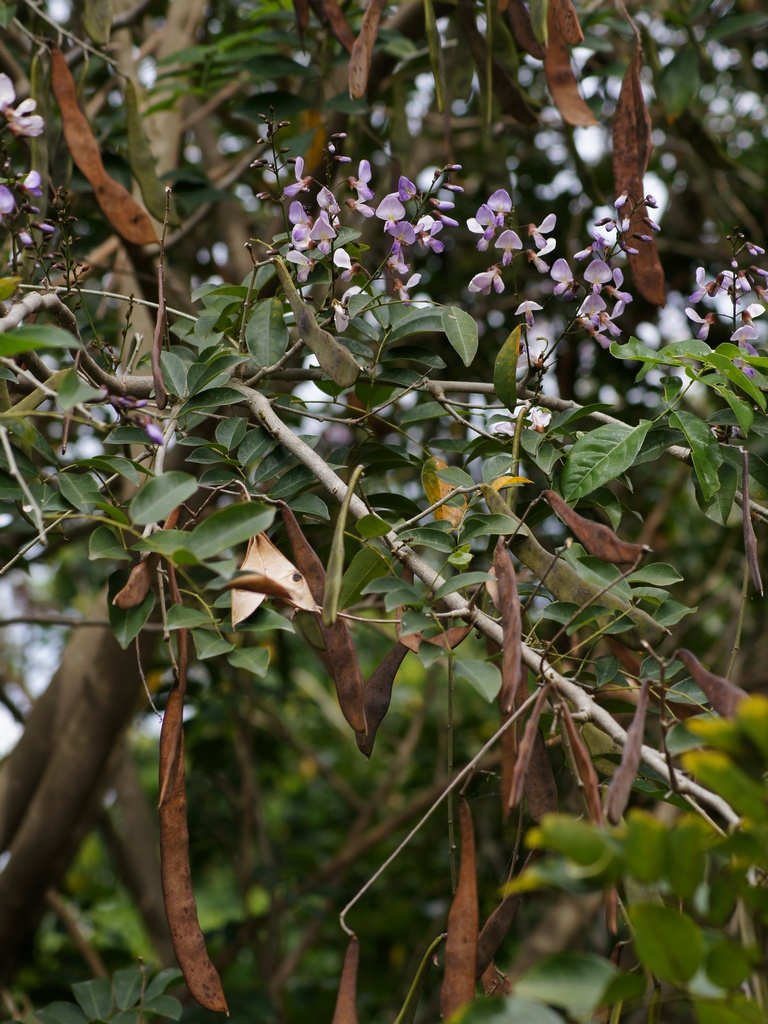

Scientific classification
- Kingdom: Plantae
- Clade: Tracheophytes
- Clade: Angiosperms
- Clade: Eudicots
- Clade: Rosids
- Order: Fabales
- Family: Fabaceae
- Subfamily: Faboideae
- Genus: Millettia
- Species: M. thonningii

Binomial name
- Millettia thonningii (Schumach.) Baker

= Millettia thonningii =

Species of legume

Millettia thonningii is a species in the genus Millettia. It is a molluscicide plant. It contains the isoflavone alpinumisoflavone that is thought to be an antischistosomal agent.
