= Millettia richardiana =

Conservation status
- Least Concern (IUCN 3.1)

Scientific classification
- Kingdom: Plantae
- Clade: Tracheophytes
- Clade: Angiosperms
- Clade: Eudicots
- Clade: Rosids
- Order: Fabales
- Family: Fabaceae
- Subfamily: Faboideae
- Genus: Millettia
- Species: M. richardiana

Binomial name
- Millettia richardiana (Baill.) Du Puy & Labat

Synonyms
- Millettia baronii Drake; Mundulea richardiana Baill. Neodunnia atrocyanea R.Vig. Neodunnia edentata R.Vig.

Species of legume

Millettia richardiana is a species of plant in the family Fabaceae. It is found only in Madagascar.
