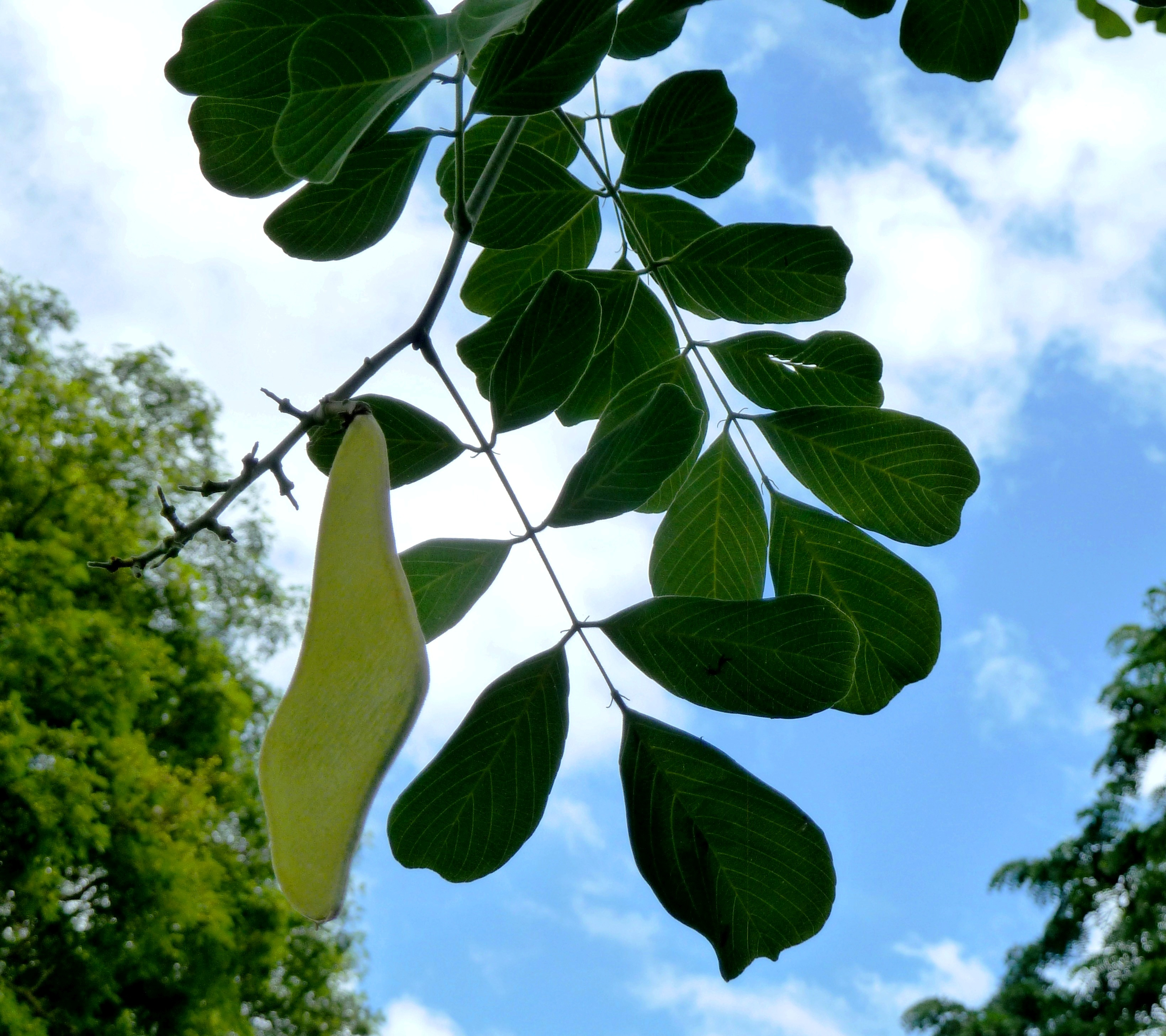

Scientific classification
- Kingdom: Plantae
- Clade: Embryophytes
- Clade: Tracheophytes
- Clade: Spermatophytes
- Clade: Angiosperms
- Clade: Eudicots
- Clade: Rosids
- Order: Fabales
- Family: Fabaceae
- Subfamily: Faboideae
- Genus: Millettia
- Species: M. stuhlmannii

Binomial name
- Millettia stuhlmannii Taub.

= Millettia stuhlmannii =

Species of plant

Millettia stuhlmannii, commonly known as panga panga, is a well-known species of timber tree that is native to the southeastern Afrotropics. The wood of the tropical species M. laurentii has similar qualities and uses, but is slightly darker, and lacks the copious yellowish white resin of the heartwood vessels. Its foliage is similar to that of Pterocarpus rotundifolius, and it may be confused with the latter when observed from a distance.

== Range and status ==
It is found in southern Tanzania, eastern Zimbabwe, Mozambique and very locally in the Venda region of South Africa. Though locally common or even dominant, over-utilization may deplete many populations. Besides harvesting for timber, their numbers are also depleted by unsustainable harvesting of bark and roots, which are employed for medicinal and magical purposes.

== Description ==
The large compound leaves are greenish above and bluish green below, with one terminal and 7 to 9 pairs of opposite leaflets. It is deciduous, with the foliage emerging before flowering time. The large, lilac flowers appear from November to January as seasonal rains commence, and are produced on long, pendulous racemes. The woody seed pods are flat and velvety, and release their seeds when they split open due to increasing torsion. The root nodules have a symbiotic relationship with rhizobial bacteria.

== Isolated chemicals ==
The flavonoid robinetin has been isolated in the heartwood and the α-amino acid (S)-canavanine has been isolated from the seeds.

== Timber value and trade ==
The highly priced and valued wood has a range of applications, including flooring, furniture, musical instruments and boat building. The heartwood is very durable, as it is not affected by fungi, dry-wood borers or termites, but the sapwood is vulnerable to powderpost beetles. It is locally sawn, and exported legally from Tanzania and Mozambique, especially Zambezia Province. It accounts for some 45% of timber legally exported from Tanzania, and much of it is bought by Chinese buyers, who in turn re-export a portion to the West.

== See also ==
- Millettia stuhlmannii
- Millettia laurentii
