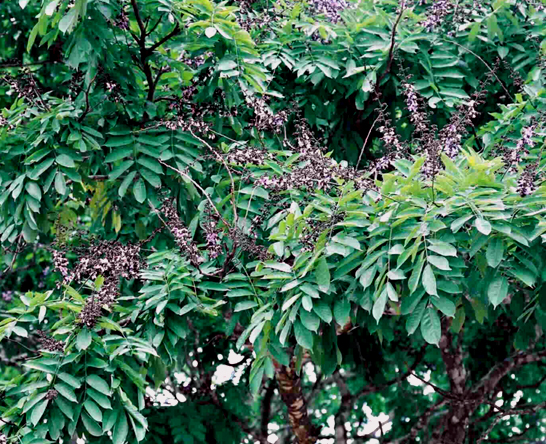
- Millettia laurentii, foliage and flowers

Scientific classification
- Kingdom: Plantae
- Clade: Tracheophytes
- Clade: Angiosperms
- Clade: Eudicots
- Clade: Rosids
- Order: Fabales
- Family: Fabaceae
- Subfamily: Faboideae
- Tribe: Millettieae
- Genus: Millettia; Wight & Arn. (1834)

Species
- See list of Millettia species

Synonyms
- Berrebera Hochst. (1844); Galedupa Lam. (1788); Neodunnia R.Vig. (1950); Otosema Benth. (1852); Pungamia Lam. (1796), nom. rej.

= Millettia =

Genus of legumes

Millettia is a genus of flowering plants in the family Fabaceae. It consists of about 169 species of shrubs, lianas or trees, which are native to tropical and subtropical regions of sub-Saharan Africa, the Indian subcontinent, Indochina, southern China, Malesia, and New Guinea. Typical habitats include tropical rain forest and seasonally-dry lowland and upland forest and forest margins, woodland, thicket, wooded grassland, and secondary vegetation.

== Description ==
In 1834, in Prodromus Florae Peninsulae Indiae Orientalis Robert Wight and George Arnott Walker-Arnott describe Millettia as:

Calyx cup-shaped, lobed or slightly toothed. Corolla papilionaceous: vexillum recurved, broad, emarginate, glabrous or silky on the back. Stamens diadelphous (9 and 1), the tenth quite distinct. Legume flat, elliptic or lanceolate, pointed, coriaceous, thick margined, wingless indehiscent, 1-2 seeded: valves closely cohering with each other all round the seeds and between them. Twining or arboreous. Leaves very large, unequally pinnated: leaflets opposite, with a setaceous partial stipule at the base of each partial petiole. Racemes axillary, more or less branched and compound. Flowers pretty large, purplish, pedicelled on shortish diverging partial peduncles.

== Etymology ==
Long known to residents of the Indies, China, and Africa, this species has had many traditional names. One of the oldest references in traditional Chinese medicine is in Bencao Gangmu Shiyi ("Supplement to Compendium of Materia Medica") where is called jixueteng. The Chinese name literally translates to "stem of chicken's blood" which refers to the red resin present in the stems of several climbing legume shrubs.

In the 1820s-1830s Charles Millett, a plant collector and an official with the East India Company, collected many samples of Millettia while living in Canton and Macao. He sent them to the University of Glasgow's Botanical Garden. In 1834, Robert Wight and George Arnott Walker-Arnott, both Scottish botanists, published Prodromus Florae Peninsulae Indiae Orientalis where the genus Millettia is first mentioned. The authors named the genus after Charles Millett, incorrectly referring to him as Dr. Charles Millett. Charles Millett of the East India Company has often been confused with Charles Millet, a French ichthyologist, who was active around the same time. In addition J. A. Millet, a French botanist from the 18th century, is often misattributed as the source.

Robert Sweet states that the genus Pongamia comes from the Malabar region in India and is derived from the local word Pongam (most likely from the Malayalam language). Pongamia had often been misattributed to Vent. (1803), but it was preceded by "Pongam Adans. (1763)", "Galedupa Lam. (1788)", and "Pungamia Lam. (1796)" and in accordance with the 1994 Tokyo Code of the International Code of Botanical Nomenclature, the correct citation was established as "Pongamia Adans. (1763)". In 1981 a proposal to conserve the genus Millettia and reject the genus Pongamia was proposed in the journal Taxon and was ratified in 1988. Most of the species formerly classed in Pongamia are now included in Millettia, with the exception of Pongamia pinnata.

== Uses ==
Species are used locally as fuelwood, fish poisons, insecticides, medicine, ornamentals, and nitrogen fixers for soil rehabilitation in agroforestry. Several species are used for timber, including the African species wenge (M. laurentii De Wild.) and panga panga or mpande (M. stuhlmannii Taub.). The timber is used for flooring, furniture, cabinet work, construction, veneers, joinery, and agricultural implements.

== Species ==
Selected species include:

- Millettia aurea
- Millettia australis - Samson's sinew (Norfolk Island)
- Millettia brandisiana
- Millettia bussei
- Millettia capuronii
- Millettia conraui
- Millettia diptera Gagnep.
- Millettia duchesnei
- Millettia elongatistyla
- Millettia eriocarpa
- Millettia galliflagrans
- Millettia grandis – Umzimbeet
- Millettia hitsika
- Millettia lacus-alberti
- Millettia laurentii – Wengé
- Millettia macrophylla
- Millettia micans
- Millettia mossambicensis
- Millettia nathaliae
- Millettia nigrescens Gagnep.
- Millettia nitida
- Millettia orientalis
- Millettia peguensis
- Millettia psilopetala
- Millettia pterocarpa
- Millettia pubinervis Kurz
- Millettia puerarioides Prain
- Millettia richardiana
- Millettia rhodantha
- Millettia sacleuxii
- Millettia schliebenii
- Millettia semseii
- Millettia sericantha
- Millettia stuhlmannii – Panga panga
- Millettia sutherlandii
- Millettia taolanaroensis
- Millettia thonningii
- Millettia usaramensis – Lesser millettia
- Millettia utilis
- Millettia warneckei
- Millettia xylocarpa Miq.
