= Villosocallerya =

Scientific classification
- Kingdom: Plantae
- Clade: Tracheophytes
- Clade: Angiosperms
- Clade: Eudicots
- Clade: Rosids
- Order: Fabales
- Family: Fabaceae
- Subfamily: Faboideae
- Tribe: Wisterieae
- Genus: Villosocallerya; L.Duan, J.Compton & Schrire (2021)
- Species: V. bonatiana

Binomial name
- Villosocallerya bonatiana (Pamp.) L.Duan, J.Compton & Schrire (2021)

Synonyms
- Millettia bonatiana Pamp. (1910); Callerya bonatiana (Pamp.) L.K.Phan (1996)

Species of plant

Villosocallerya bonatiana is a species of flowering plant in the family Fabaceae, native to south-central and southeastern mainland China, Laos and Vietnam. It is the sole species in genus Villosocallerya. The species was first described in 1910 as Millettia bonatiana.

== Taxonomy ==
Villosocallerya bonatiana was first described by Renato Pampanini in 1910 as Millettia bonatiana. A 2019 molecular phylogenetic study found it to be the first diverging member of a narrowly circumscribed genus Callerya, and so placed in that genus. A 2021 study obtained different results using chloroplast DNA (cpDNA) and nuclear ribosomal DNA (nrDNA). The cpDNA results agreed with the 2019 study where Callerya bonatiana was sister to the rest of the genus Callerya; the nrDNA results placed Callerya bonatiana as sister to a larger clade, including Kanburia, Whitfordiodendron and Afgekia sericea. The left hand cladogram shows the tree using cpDNA, the right hand one the tree using nrDNA (with other genera omitted in both trees).

- cpDNA
  - Afgekia
  - - Whitfordiodendron
    - - Kanburia
      - - Rest of Callerya
        - Callerya bonatiana

- nrDNA
  - - - - Afgekia
        - Kanburia
      - Whitfordiodendron
    - Rest of Callerya
  - Callerya bonatiana

Given the position of Callerya bonatiana in the nrDNA tree, a new genus, Villosocallerya was established, and Callerya bonatiana treated as Villosocallerya bonatiana. As of September 2023, Villosocallerya is recognized by Plants of the World Online.
