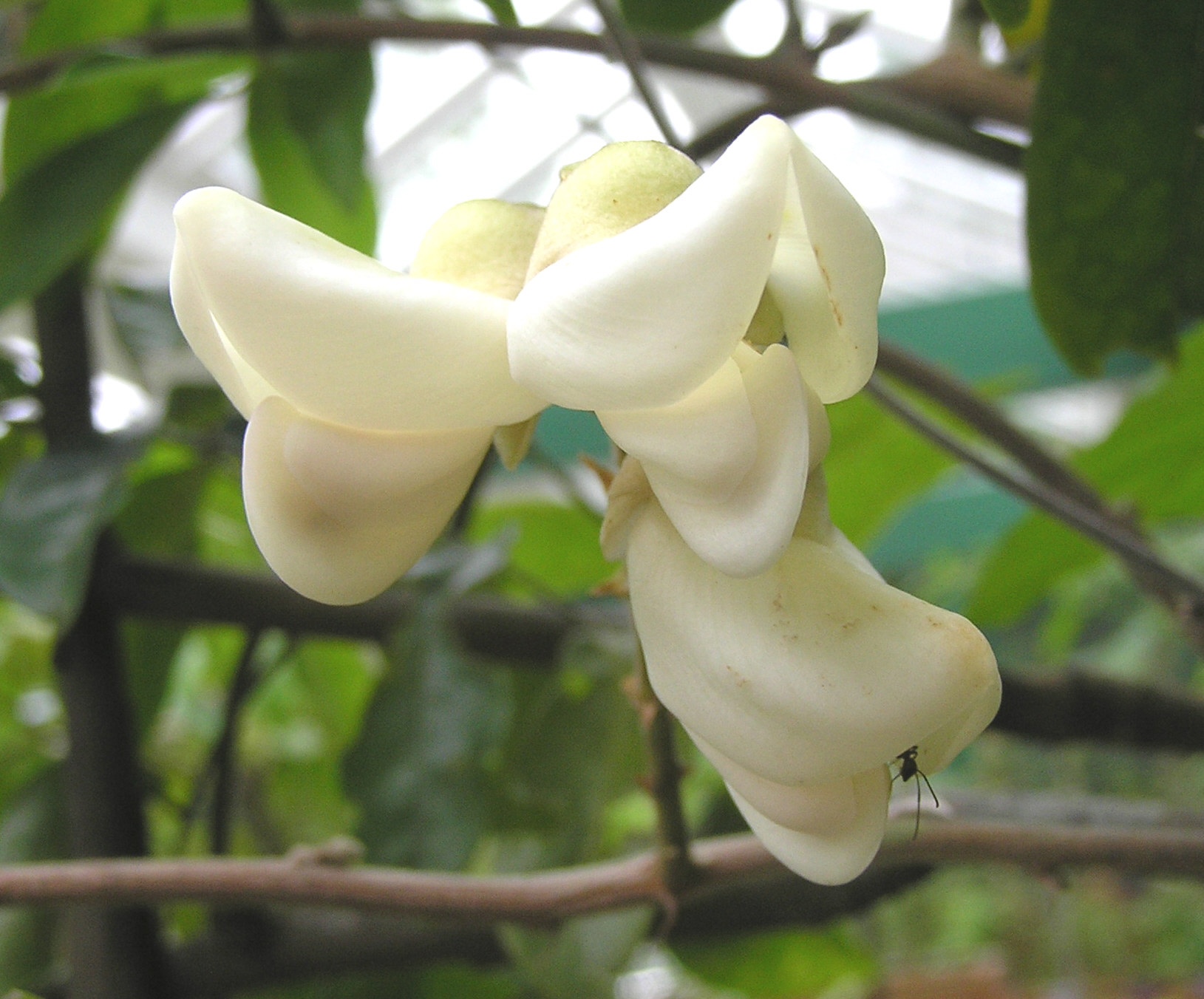
- Nanhaia speciosa

Scientific classification
- Kingdom: Plantae
- Clade: Tracheophytes
- Clade: Angiosperms
- Clade: Eudicots
- Clade: Rosids
- Order: Fabales
- Family: Fabaceae
- Subfamily: Faboideae
- Tribe: Wisterieae
- Genus: Nanhaia; J.Compton & Schrire

Type species
- Nanhaia speciosa (Champ. ex Benth.) J.Compton & Schrire ≡ Millettia speciosa Champ. ex Benth.

Synonyms
- Millettia sect. Corynecarpae Z.Wei

= Nanhaia =

Genus of flowering plants

Nanhaia is a genus of flowering plants belonging to the family Fabaceae. Its native range is Southern China to Northern Vietnam.

== Description ==
Nanhaia species are twining vines, sprawling or scrambling among rocks and scrub. Their stems are green or brown. Their leaves are evergreen and generally have 4–16 paired leaflets plus a terminal leaflet. The leaflets are 3–9 cm (1.2–3.5 in) long by 1–4 cm (0.4–1.6 in) wide. The erect or pendant inflorescence is a panicle, 4–20 cm (2–8 in) long, frequently composed of several leafy lateral racemes. The individual flowers are 16–32 mm (0.6–1.3 in) long and have the general shape of members of the subfamily Faboideae. The standard petal is 12–18 mm (0.5–0.7 in) long by 11–18 mm (0.4–0.7 in) wide, white, cream or pink in colour, with a green nectar guide. The wing petals are about the same length as the keel at 12–17 mm (0.5–0.7 in) long by 4–6 mm (0.2–0.2 in) wide, free from the keel and with short basal claws. The keel petals are 12–16 mm (0.5–0.6 in) long by 4–6 mm (0.2–0.2 in) wide with a claw up to 9 mm (0.4 in) long. Nine of the stamens are fused together, the other is free; all curve upwards at the apex. The flat seed pods are 10–20 cm (3.9–7.9 in) long by 1–2 cm (0.4–0.8 in) wide, brown and hard when dry, splitting to release their 2–10 seeds.

== Taxonomy ==
The genus Nanhaia was established in 2019 following a molecular phylogenetic study which showed that two species that Anne M. Schot had placed in Callerya in 1994 did not belong with the type species of that genus. The genus name is based on the Chinese name for the South China Sea between China and Vietnam, Nánhǎi (南海).

Nanhaia is placed in the tribe Wisterieae, where it forms a clade with the genus Wisteriopsis. Nanhaia has larger flowers (usually over rather than under 15 mm (0.6 in) long) and densely hairy rather than hairless ovaries.

=== Species ===
As of January 2023, Plants of the World Online accepted two species:

- Nanhaia fordii (Dunn) J.Compton & Schrire
- Nanhaia speciosa (Champ. ex Benth.) J.Compton & Schrire

== Distribution ==
Nanhaia species are native to south-central and southeast mainland China, Hainan and Vietnam.
