= Serawaia =

Scientific classification
- Kingdom: Plantae
- Clade: Tracheophytes
- Clade: Angiosperms
- Clade: Eudicots
- Clade: Rosids
- Order: Fabales
- Family: Fabaceae
- Subfamily: Faboideae
- Tribe: Wisterieae
- Genus: Serawaia; J.Compton & Schrire (2019)
- Species: S. strobilifera

Binomial name
- Serawaia strobilifera (Schot) J.Compton & Schrire (2019)

Synonyms
- Callerya strobilifera Schot (1994)

Monotypic genus of flowering plants

Serawaia is a monotypic genus of flowering plants in the family Fabaceae, first established in 2019. Its only species is Serawaia strobilifera, endemic to Borneo. The species was first described in 1994 as Callerya strobilifera.

== Description ==
Serawaia strobilifera is a twining vine scrambling up trees and river banks to a height of 8 m (26 ft). Its stems are white or very pale grey. Its leaves are evergreen and generally have 2–3 pairs of leaflets plus a terminal leaflet. The erect inflorescence consists of a slightly branched panicle 12–20 cm (5–8 in) long. Individual flowers are 15–21 mm (0.6–0.8 in) long and have the general shape of members of the subfamily Faboideae. Uniquely in the tribe Wisterieae, they are golden yellow in colour. The standard petal is 15–18 mm (0.6–0.7 in) long by 11–17 mm (0.4–0.7 in) wide, lemon or golden yellow, with a yellow nectar guide. The wing petals are about the same length as the keel at 12–14 mm (0.5–0.6 in) long by 4–5 mm (0.2 in) wide. They are completely free from the keel and have short basal claws. The keel petals are 11–13 mm (0.4–0.5 in) long by 4–5 mm (0.2 in) wide. Nine of the stamens are fused together, the other is free; all curve upwards at the apex. The flattened seed pods are 19–30 cm (7.5–11.8 in) long by 2–2.5 cm (0.8–1.0 in) wide, splitting to release their 2-3 seeds.

== Taxonomy ==
Serawaia strobilifera was first described by Anne M. Schot in 1994 as Callerya strobilifera. A 2019 molecular phylogenetic study showed that it fell outside the clade containing the type species of Callerya, and the new genus Serawaia was established for this species. The generic name refers to the Serawai river in west Kalimantan where the species was first discovered. In the 2019 study, the genus formed a clade with Afgekia, Callerya, Kanburia and Whitfordiodendron. Its yellow flowers are one distinguishing feature.
