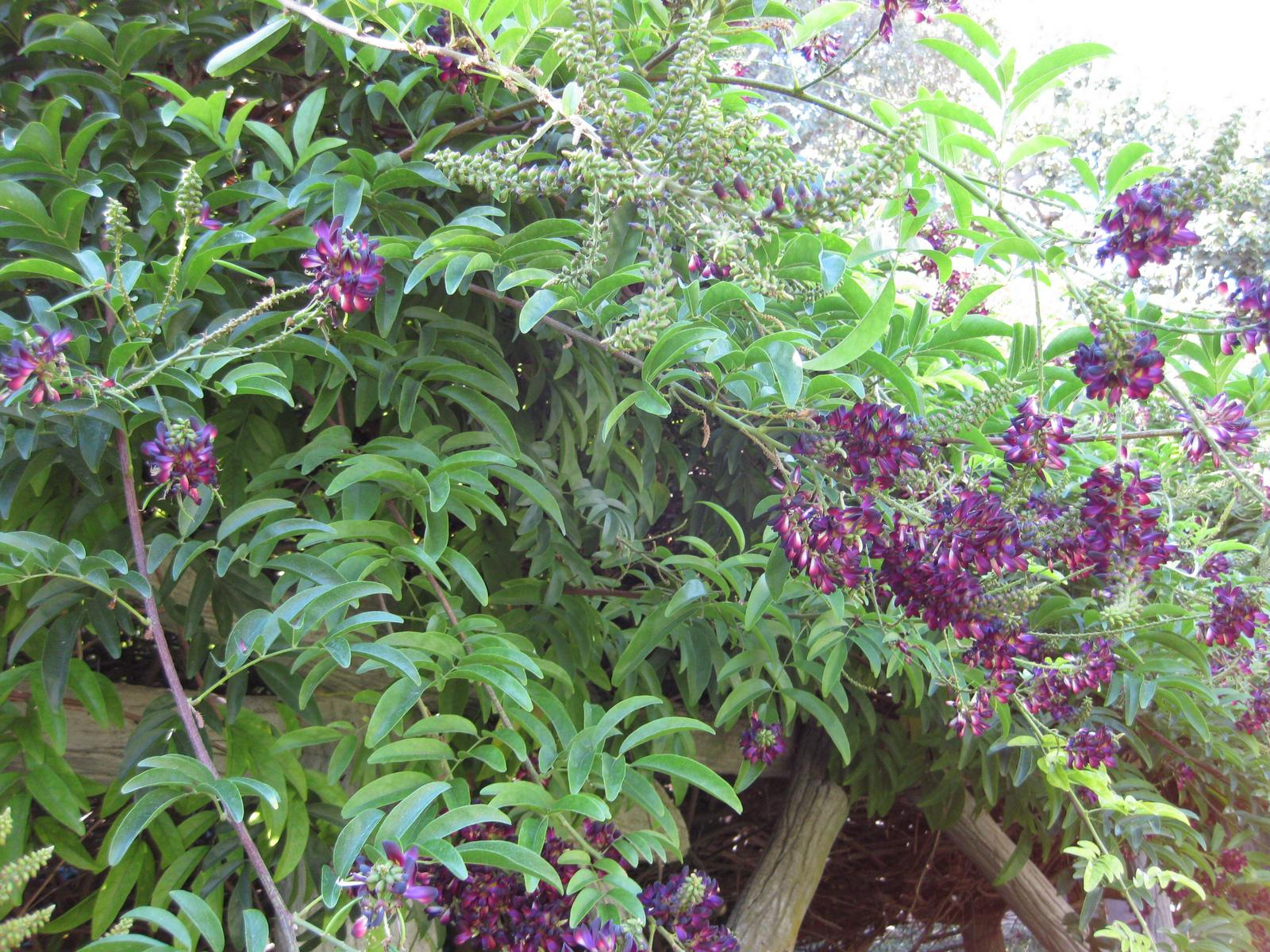
- In cultivation at the Huntington Gardens, California

Scientific classification
- Kingdom: Plantae
- Clade: Tracheophytes
- Clade: Angiosperms
- Clade: Eudicots
- Clade: Rosids
- Order: Fabales
- Family: Fabaceae
- Subfamily: Faboideae
- Tribe: Wisterieae
- Genus: Wisteriopsis
- Species: W. reticulata

Binomial name
- Wisteriopsis reticulata (Benth.) J.Compton & Schrire

Synonyms
- Callerya reticulata (Benth.) Schot; Millettia cognata Hance; Millettia purpurea Yatabe; Millettia reticulata Benth.; Phaseoloides cognatum (Hance) Kuntze; Phaseoloides reticulatum (Benth.) Kuntze

= Wisteriopsis reticulata =

Species of plant

Wisteriopsis reticulata is a species of flowering plant in the family Fabaceae, native to mainland China, Hainan, Taiwan and Vietnam. It was first described by George Bentham in 1852 as Millettia reticulata. Anne M. Schot moved it to Callerya reticulata in 1994, then as a result of a molecular phylogenetic study in 2019, it was moved to the newly created genus Wisteriopsis. It has become naturalized in parts of Florida and Japan.

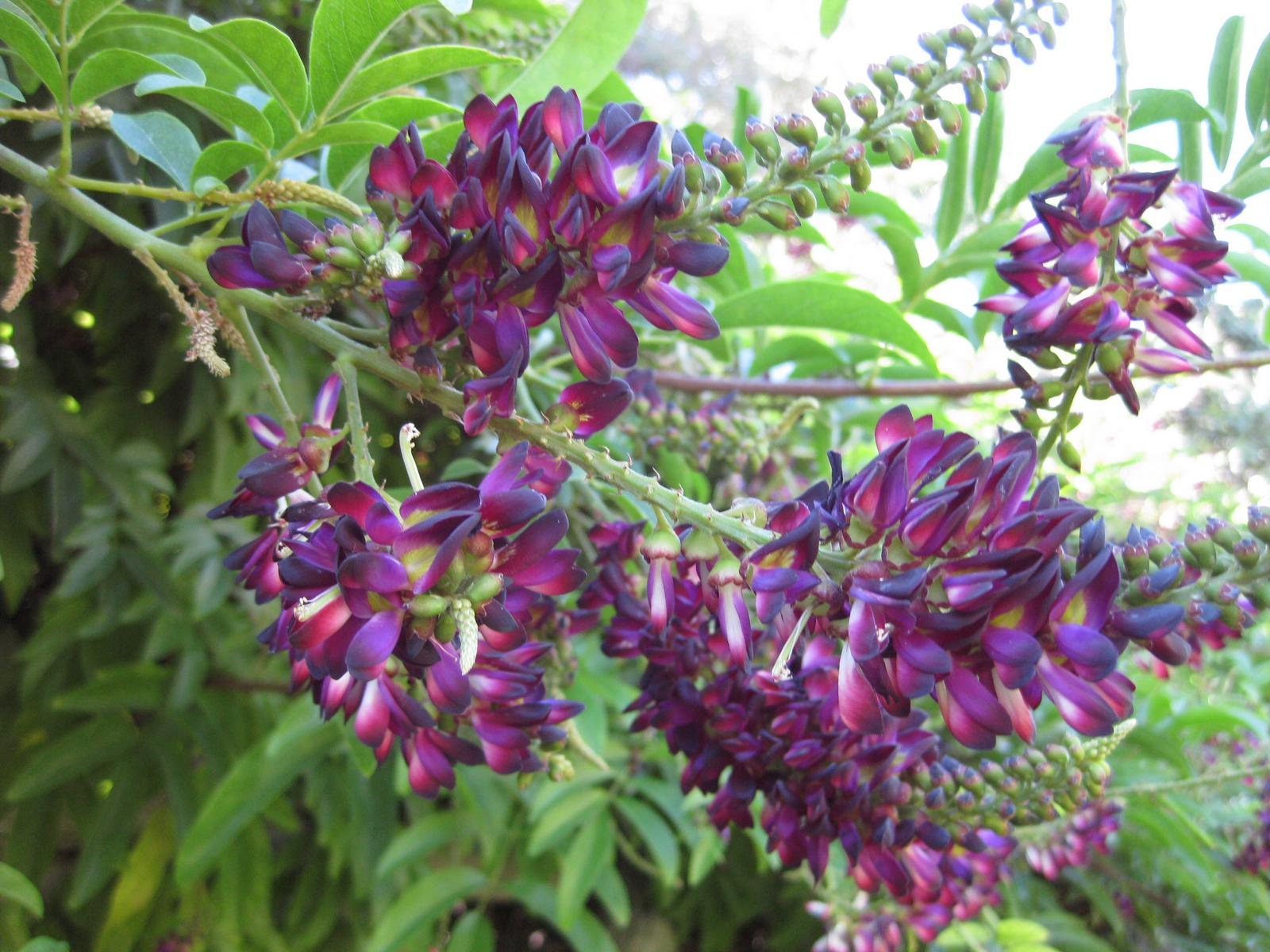
Branched inflorescence
