= Anne M. Schot =

Nederlander Botanist

- Born: Anne Marketta Schot; 1966; Leidschendam, Netherlands
- Education: Stedelijk Gymnasium Leiden
- Alma mater: Universiteit Leiden
- Children: 3
- Scientific career
- Thesis: Systematics of Aporosa (Euphorbiaceae) (2004)
- Doctoral advisor: Pieter Baas
- Other academic advisors: Paul Brakefield, J. Windy, Robert Geesink, J.W.A. Knight-Numan, M.C. Rose, Peter C. van Welzen

Anne M. Schot (born 1966) is a Dutch botanist.

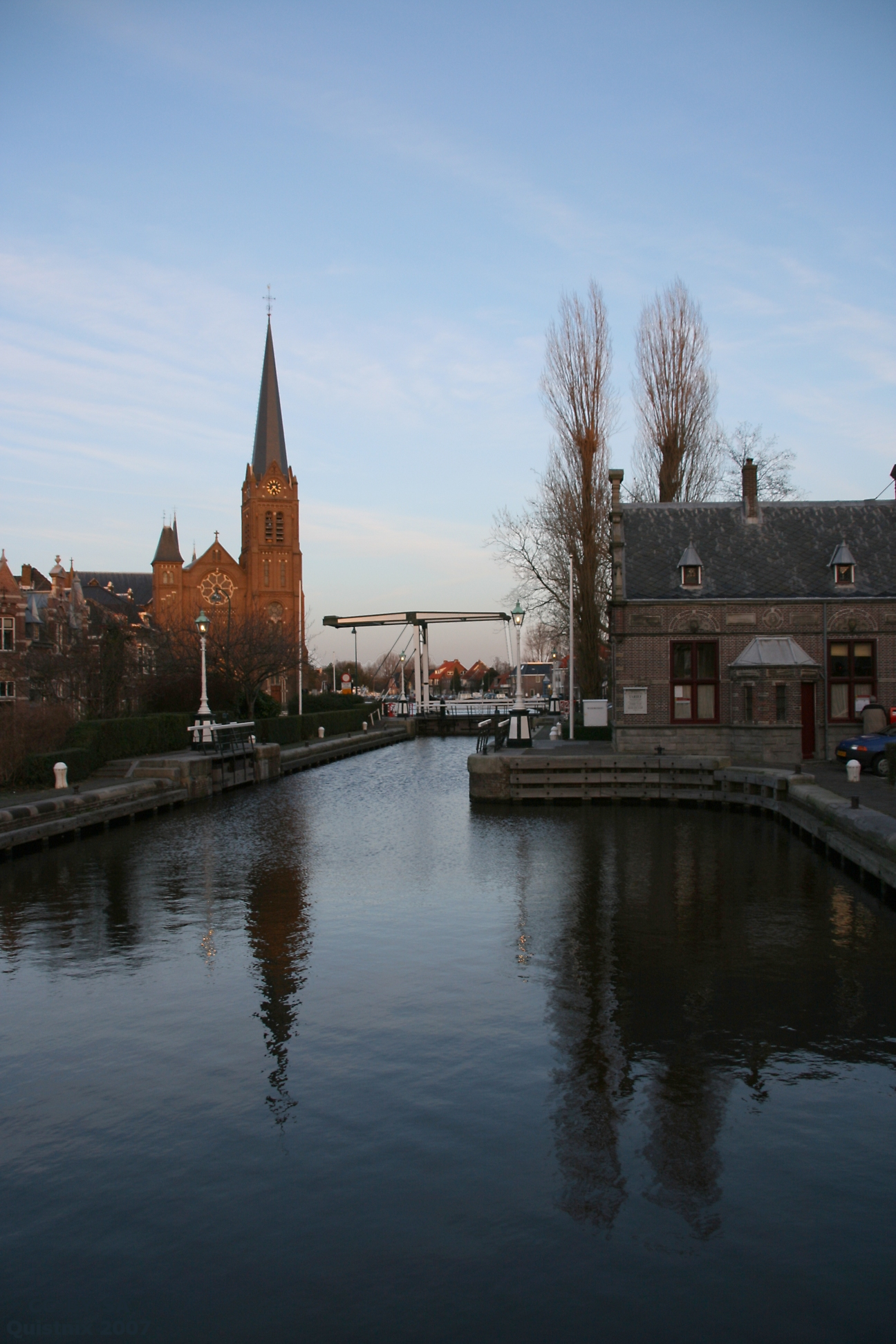
Lock at Leidschendam

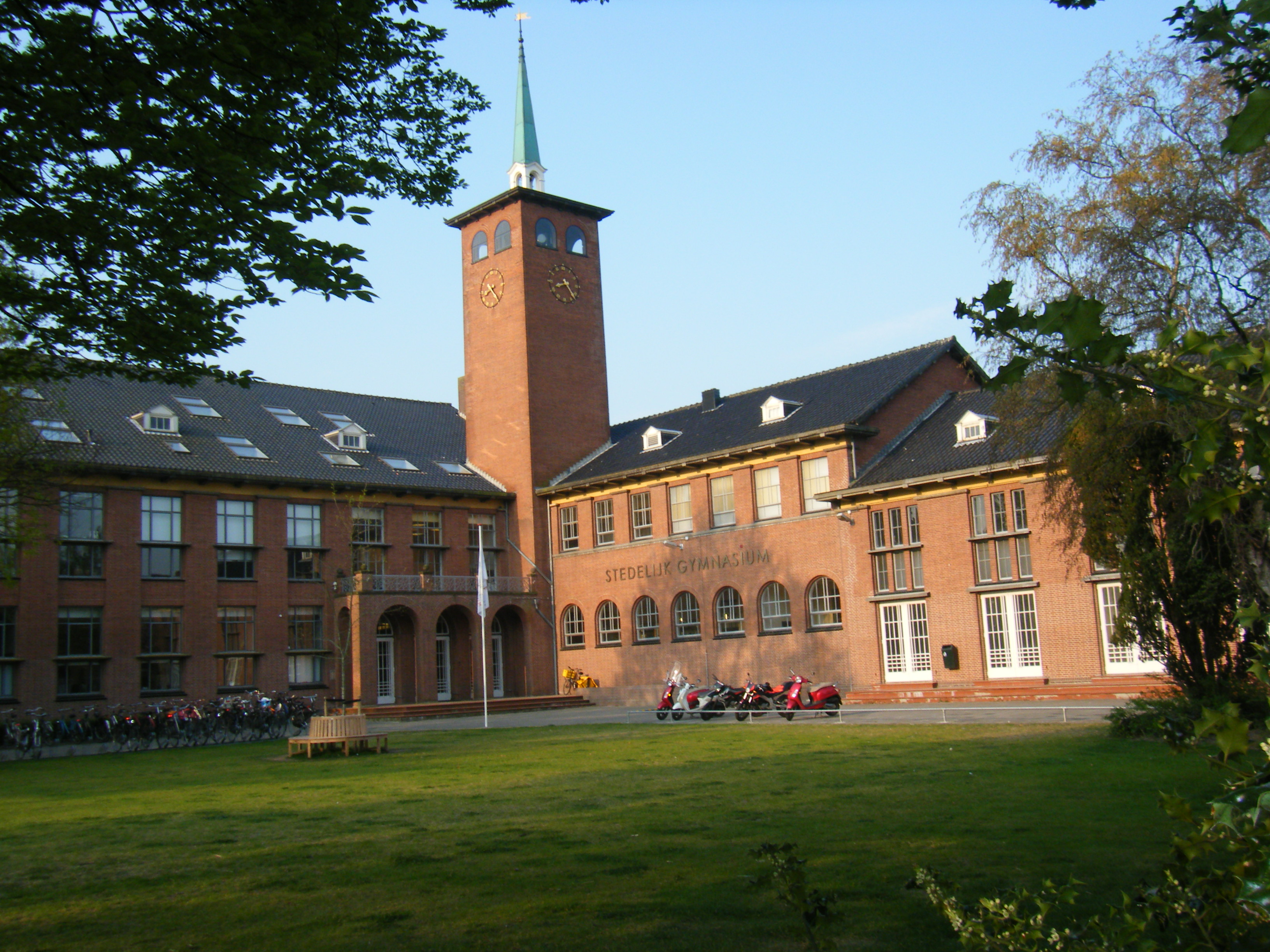
Stedelijk Gymnasium Leiden 2011

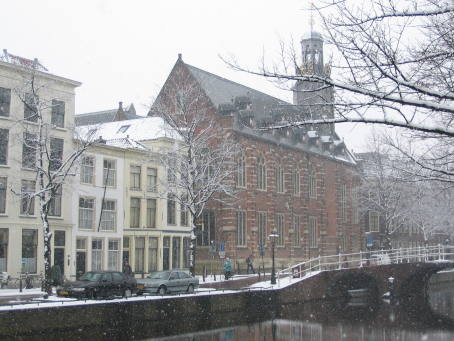
Acadamiegebouw (Academy building), Universiteit Leiden

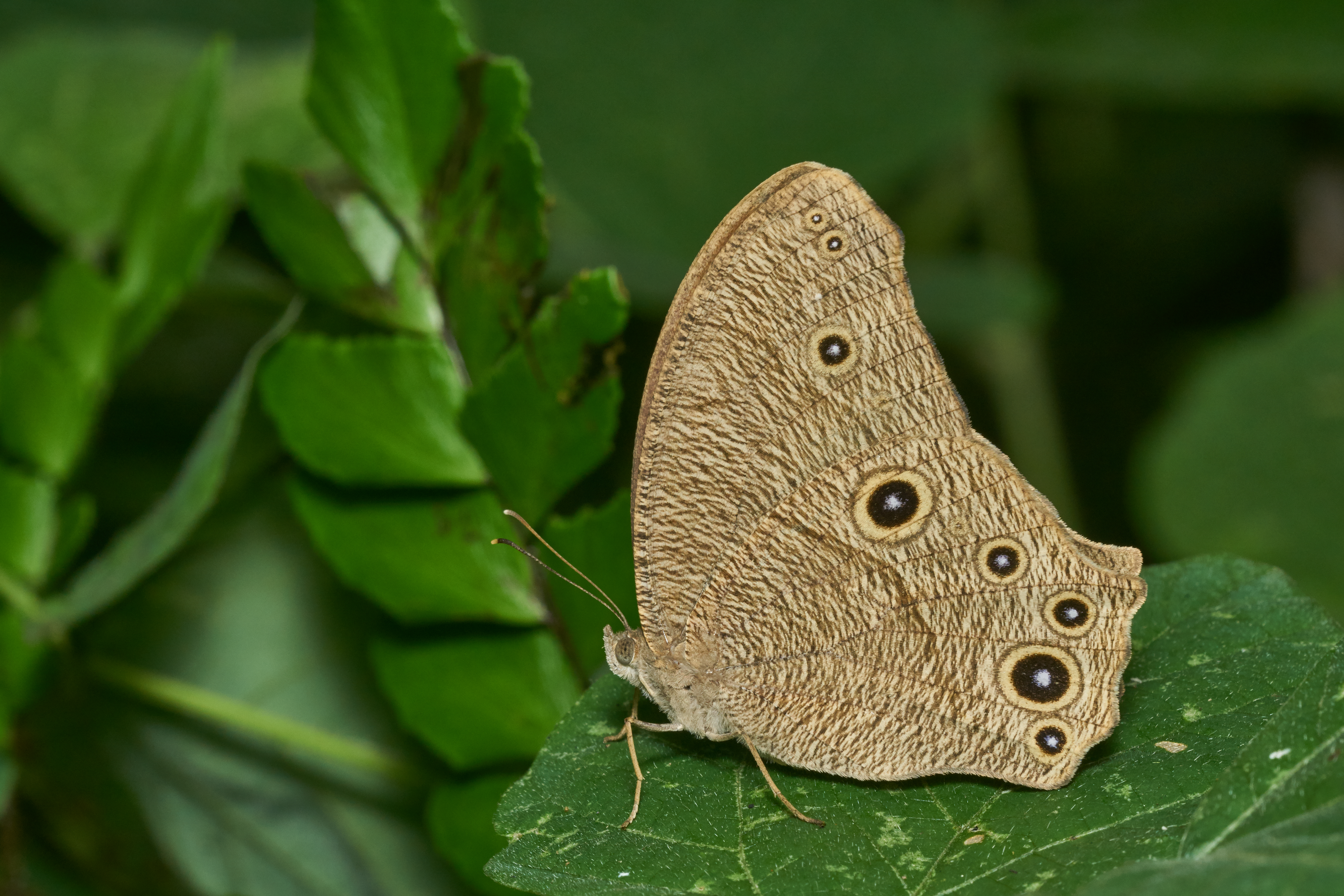
Melanitis leda

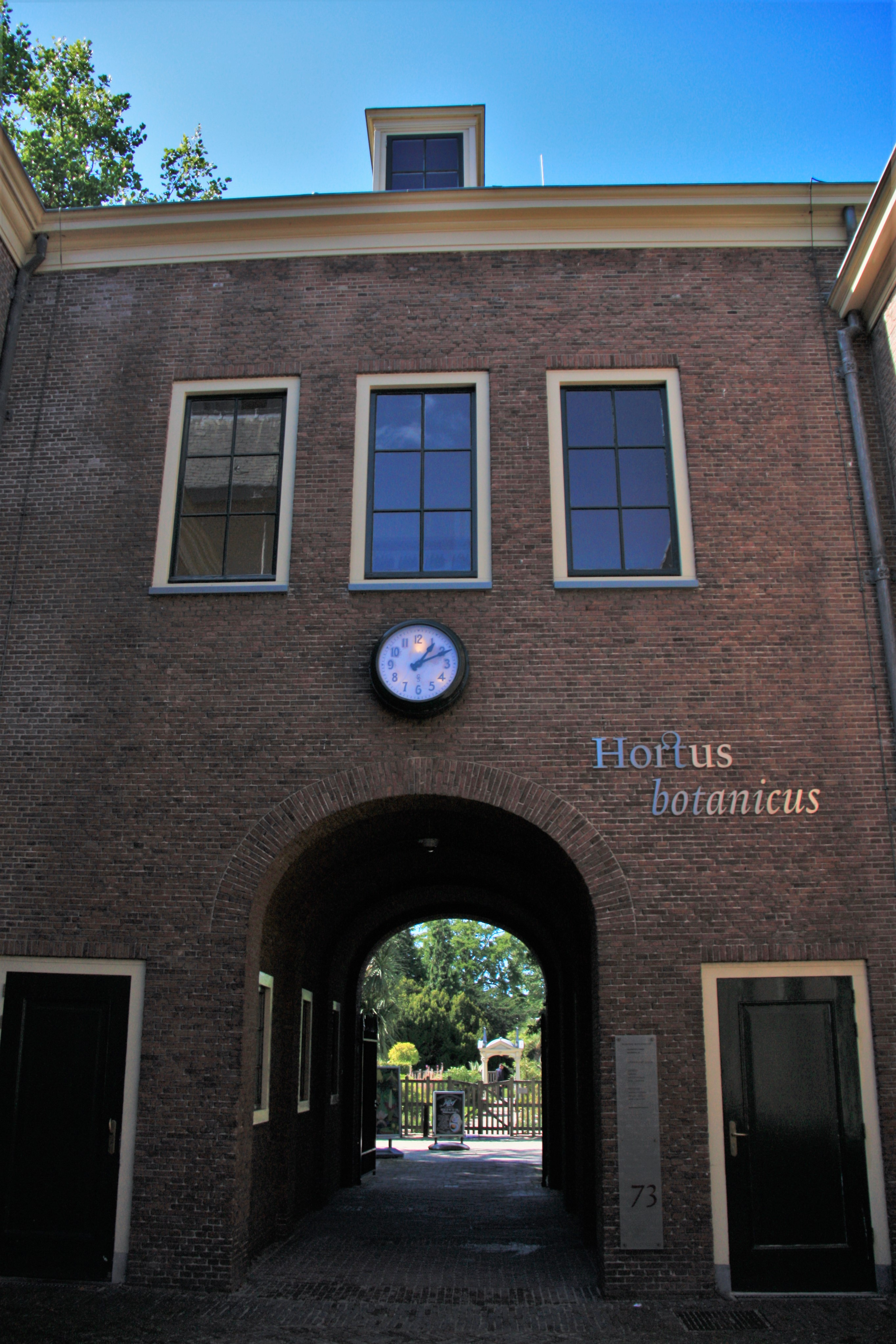
Entrance to Hortus Botanicus Leiden

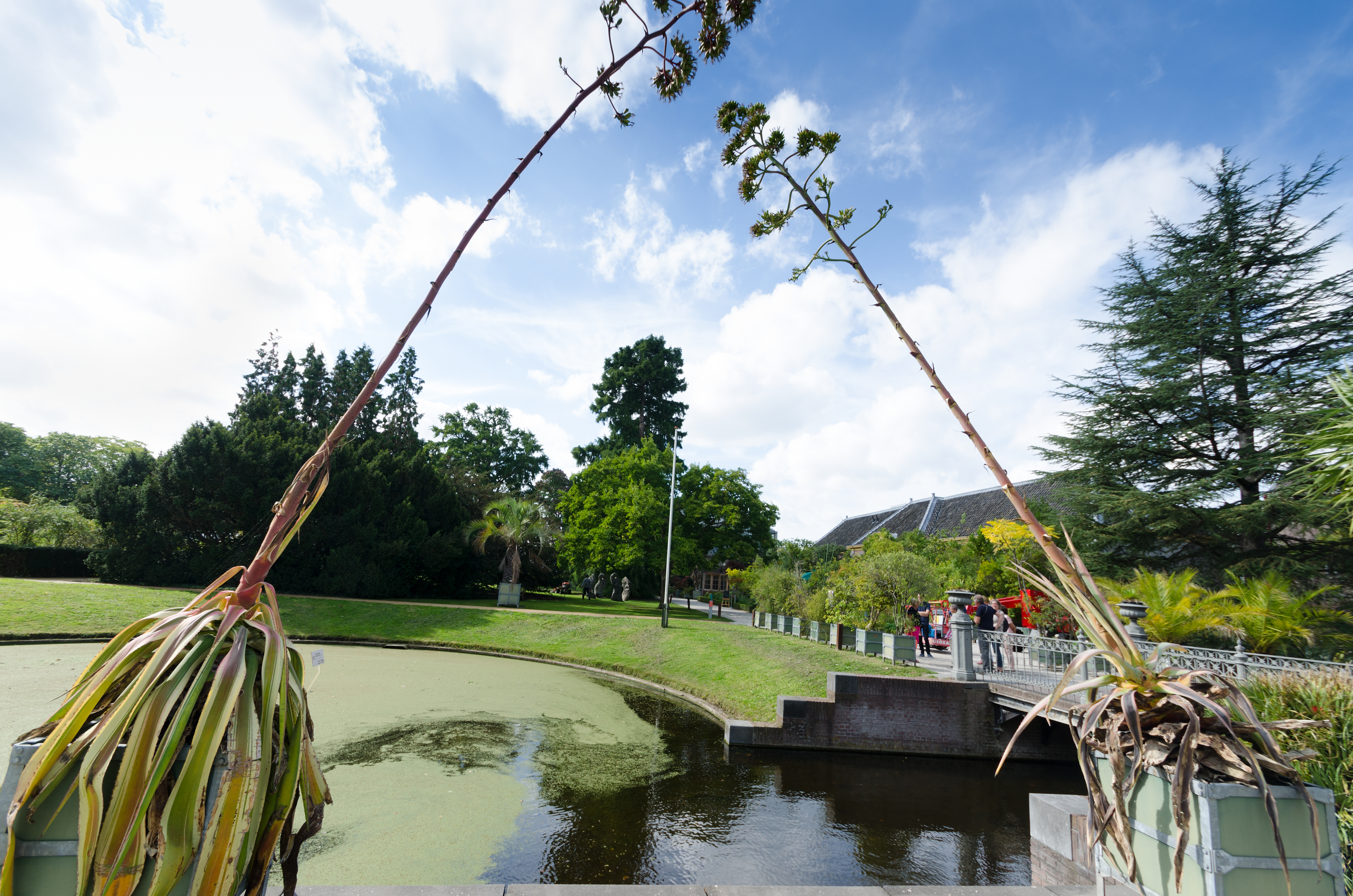
Hortus Botanicus Leiden

== Early life ==
Anne M Schot was born on 20 September 1966 in Leidschendam, a town in South Holland province, Netherlands (Leidschendam has effectively become a suburb of Den Haag). She completed her diploma at the Stedelijk Gymnasium Leiden in 1984. In 1985 she started studies in Biology at Universiteit Leiden. She graduated in August 1991 with subjects in Evolutionary Biology and in Plant Geoegraphy, with the following works:

- 1. Een kwantitatieve analyse van de schutkleur bij Melanitis leda (Fabricius) (Lepidoptera: Satyridae) (A quantitative analysis of the camouflage color in Melanitis leda [Fabricius] [Lepidoptera: Satyridae]), under the supervision of Paul Brakefield, and J. Windy of the Institute of Evolutionary and Ecological Sciences;
- 2. Phylogenetic relations and historical biogeography of Fordia and Imbralyx (Papilionaceae: Millettieae), under the supervision of Robert Geesink and J.W.A. Knight-Numan of the Rijksherbarium/Hortus Botanicus research institute at Leiden.

During her undergraduate studies, she worked as a Student Assistant in the first year biology subject "Overview of the animal kingdom" and on the domestic excursion.

== Career ==
She was employed as a Training Assistant of the Rijksherbarium/Hortus Botanicus research institute in Leiden (now the Universiteit Leiden branch of the Nationaal Herbarium Nederland) from 1 June 1992 to 31 May 1996, working on research of the genus Aporosa.

From 1 June 1996 until at least 2004, she was a part-time guest-worker at the Nationaal Herbarium Nederland, Universiteit Leiden branch, where she was carrying out research that resulted in her doctoral thesis. During this time she first worked as a freelance translator, from June 1996, for the translation agency Bothof. In April 1997 her first daughter was born. From 1 March 1998 she worked in Rotterdam as an Application Designer Cobol in the Salaries and HR department for the information and communications technology company Roccade Civility. This company acquired other companies and from 1 January 2004 Schot was working for the PinkRoccade Payroll and HR Services division of the operating company PinkRoccade Public Sector. In March 1999 and in February 2003 Schot gave birth to her second and third daughters.

In November 2004 she completed her Ph.D under the supervision of Pieter Baas, co-supervised by M.C. Rose and Peter C. van Welzen, with referent M.C.M. Sosef (Wageningen University) and other members of the promotion commission, E. Gittenberger and P.J.M. Maas (Universiteit Utrecht). Her thesis was entitled Systematics of Aporosa (Euphorbiaceae), and it was published in the journal Blumea in that year, 2004. In a review by Levin, this is described as "the first comprehensive monograph of the genus in more than 80 years." Petra Hoffman, in her 2006 review, writes that "[Schot] did not dodge difficulties as is unfortunately so often seen in other [taxonomic] keys. She has delivered an excellent piece of work with regards species identification." At the end of her review Hoffman writes:

"In summary, this taxonomic revision is a tremendous achievement. Aporosa is by far the largest euphorbiaceous genus treated in such detail since Pax & Hoffmann's "Pflanzenreich" at the beginning of the 20th century."

She is one of the researchers on the Flora Malesiana

== Taxa described ==
- Aporosa sect. Benthamianae Schot, Blumea, Suppl. 17: 155 (2004).
- Aporosa sect. Papuanae Schot, Blumea, Suppl. 17: 155 (2004).
- Aporosa sect. Sundanenses Schot, Blumea, Suppl. 17: 156 (2004).
- Aporosa alia Schot, Blumea 40(2): 453 (1995).
- Aporosa annulata Schot, Blumea 40(2): 454 (1995) (1995).
- Aporosa carrii Schot, Blumea 40(2): 454 (1995) (1995).
- Aporosa chondroneura (Airy Shaw) Schot, Blumea 40(2): 451 (1995): (1995).
- Aporosa dendroidea Schot, Blumea 40(2): 455 (1995) (1995).
- Aporosa fulvovittata Schot, Blumea 40(2): 455 (1995) (1995).
- Aporosa longicaudata Kaneh. & Hatus. ex Schot, Blumea 40(2): 456 (1995) (1995).
- Aporosa lucida var. pubescens Schot, Blumea 40(2): 457 (1995) (1995).
- Aporosa lucida var. trilocularis Schot, Blumea 40(2): 457 (1995) (1995).
- Aporosa misimana Airy Shaw ex Schot, Blumea 40(2): 457 (1995) (1995).
- Aporosa octandra var. malesiana Schot, Blumea 40(2): 452 (1995), nom. nov. (1995).
- Aporosa octandra var. yunnanensis (Pax & K.Hoffm.) Schot, Blumea 40(2): 452 (1995): (1995).
- Aporosa parvula Schot, Blumea 40(2): 457 (1995) (1995).
- Aporosa praegrandifolia (S.Moore) Schot, Blumea, Suppl. 17: 309 (2004).
- Aporosa sarawakensis Schot, Blumea 40(2): 458 (1995) (1995).
- Aporosa symplocoides var. chalarocarpa (Airy Shaw) Schot, Blumea 40(2): 453 (1995): (1995).
- Aporosa vagans Schot, Blumea 40(2): 459 (1995) (1995).

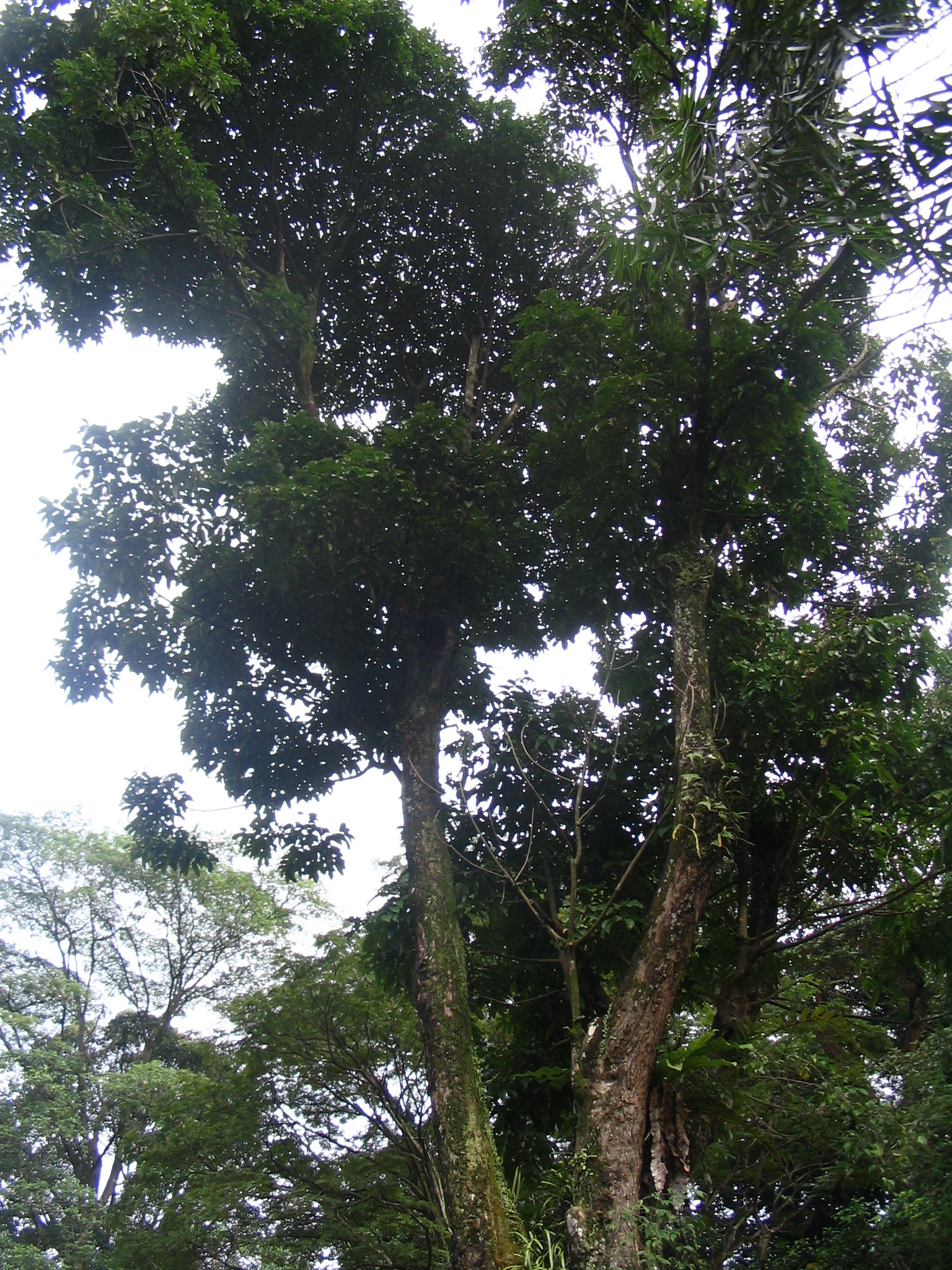
Adinobotrys atropurpureus

- Callerya atropurpurea (Wall.) Schot, Blumea 39(1–2): 15 (1994): (1994), now synonym of Adinobotrys atropurpureus (Wall.) Dunn
- Callerya australis (Endl.) Schot, Blumea 39(1–2): 16 (1994): (1994), now synonym of Austrocallerya australis (Endl.) J.Compton & Schrire
- Callerya cinerea (Benth.) Schot, Blumea 39(1–2): 17 (1994): (1994).
- Callerya cochinchinensis (Gagnep.) Schot, Blumea 39(1–2): 19 (1994): (1994).
- Callerya dasyphylla (Miq.) Schot, Blumea 39(1–2): 20 (1994): (1994), now synonym of Padbruggea dasyphylla Miq.
- Callerya eriantha (Benth.) Schot, Blumea 39(1–2): 21 (1994): (1994), now synonym of Whitfordiodendron erianthum (Benth.) Dunn
- Callerya eurybotrya (Drake) Schot, Blumea 39(1–2): 22 (1994): (1994), now synonym of Wisteriopsis eurybotrya (Drake) J.Compton & Schrire
- Callerya fordii (Dunn) Schot, Blumea 39(1–2): 23 (1994): (1994), now synonym of Nanhaia fordii (Dunn) J.Compton & Schrire
- Callerya kityana (Craib) Schot, Blumea 39(1–2): 24 (1994): (1994), now synonym of Sigmoidala kityana (Craib) J.Compton & Schrire
- Callerya megasperma (F.Muell.) Schot, Blumea 39(1–2): 25 (1994): (1994), now synonym of Austrocallerya megasperma (F.Muell.) J.Compton & Schrire

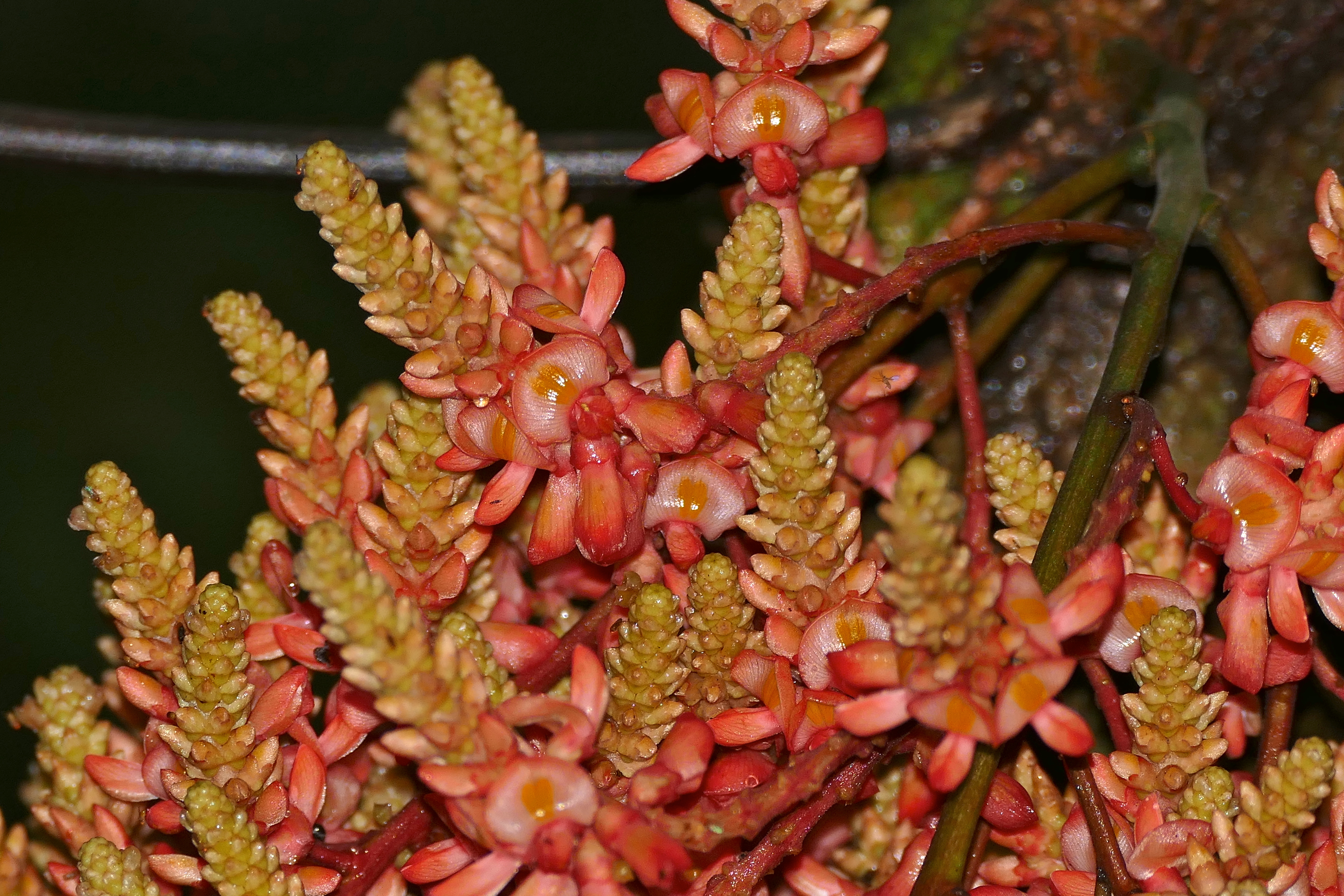
Whitfordiodendron nieuwenhuisii flowers

- Callerya nieuwenhuisii (J.J.Sm.) Schot, Blumea 39(1–2): 26 (1994): (1994), now synonym of Whitfordiodendron nieuwenhuisii (J.J.Sm.) Dunn
- Callerya pilipes (F.M.Bailey) Schot, Blumea 39(1–2): 29 (1994): (1994), now synonym of Austrocallerya pilipes (F.M.Bailey) J.Compton & Schrire
- Callerya reticulata (Benth.) Schot, Blumea 39(1–2): 29 (1994): (1994), now synonym of Wisteriopsis reticulata (Benth.) J.Compton & Schrire
- Callerya scandens (Elmer) Schot, Blumea 39(1–2): 31 (1994): (1994), now synonym of Whitfordiodendron scandens (Elmer) Elmer
- Callerya speciosa (Champ.) Schot, Blumea 39(1–2): 32 (1994): (1994), now synonym of Nanhaia speciosa (Champ. ex Benth.) J.Compton & Schrire
- Callerya strobilifera Schot, Blumea 39(1–2): 32 (1994) (1994), now synonym of Serawaia strobilifera (Schot) J.Compton & Schrire
- Callerya sumatrana (Merr.) Schot, Blumea 39(1–2): 35 (1994): (1994), now synonym of Whitfordiodendron sumatranum Merr.
- Callerya vasta (Kosterm.) Schot, Blumea 39(1–2): 36 (1994): (1994), now synonym of Adinobotrys vastus (Kosterm.) J.Compton & Schrire
- Fordia albiflora (Prain) U.A.Dasuki & Schot, Blumea 36(1): 195 (1991): (1991).
- Fordia bracteolata U.A.Dasuki & Schot, Blumea 36(1): 196 (1991) (1991).
- Fordia leptobotrys (Dunn) Schot, U.A.Dasuki & Buijsen, Blumea 36(1): 198 (1991): (1991).
- Fordia nivea (Dunn) U.A.Dasuki & Schot, Blumea 36(1): 199 (1991): (1991).
- Fordia rheophytica (Buijsen) U.A.Dasuki & Schot, Blumea 36(1): 201 (1991): (1991).
- Fordia unifoliata (Prain) U.A.Dasuki & Schot, Blumea 36(1): 202 (1991): (1991).

== Publications ==
- Dasuki, U.A. & A.M. Schot, 1991. Taxonomy of Fordia Hemsley (Papilionaceae: Millettieae). Blumea 36: 191-204.
- Schot, A.M., 1991. Phylogenetic relations and historical biogeography of Fordia and Imbralyx (Papilionaceae: Millettieae). Blumea 36: 205-234.
- Schot, A.M., 1991. The two New Guinea species of Lepiderema Radlk. (Sapindaceae). Blumea 36: 235–238.
- Schot, A.M., 1994. A. revision of Callerya Endl. (including Padbruggea and Whitfordiodendron) (Papilionaceae: Millettieae). Blumea 39: 1-40.
- Schot, A.M. 1994. Lepiderema. In: F. Adema, P.W. Leenhouts & P.C. van Welzen (eds.), Flora Malesiana ser. 1, 11: 618–620, fig. 49. Rijksherbarium/Hortus Botanicus, Leiden.
- Schot, A.M., 1995. A synopsis of taxonomic changes in Aporosa Blume (Euphorbiaceae). Blumea 40: 449–460.
- Schot, A.M. 1996. Proposal to reject the name Excoecaria integrifolia in order to maintain Aporosa aurea (Euphorbiaceae). Taxon 45: 553.
- Schot, A.[M.], 1997. Systematics of Aporosa (Euphorbiaceae). In: J. Dransfield, M.J.E. Coode & D.A. Simpson (eds), Plant diversity in Malesia III. Proceedings of the third international Flora Malesiana symposium 1995: 265–284.
- Schot, A.M., 1998. Biogeography of Aporosa (Euphorbiaceae): testing a phylogenetic hypothesis using geology and distribution patterns. In: R. Hall & J.D. Holloway (eds.), Biogeography and geological evolution of SE Asia (Backhuys publishers): 279–290.
- Schot, A.M., 2004, Systematics of Aporosa (Euphorbiaceae), Blumea, 17 (Supplement):1-380
