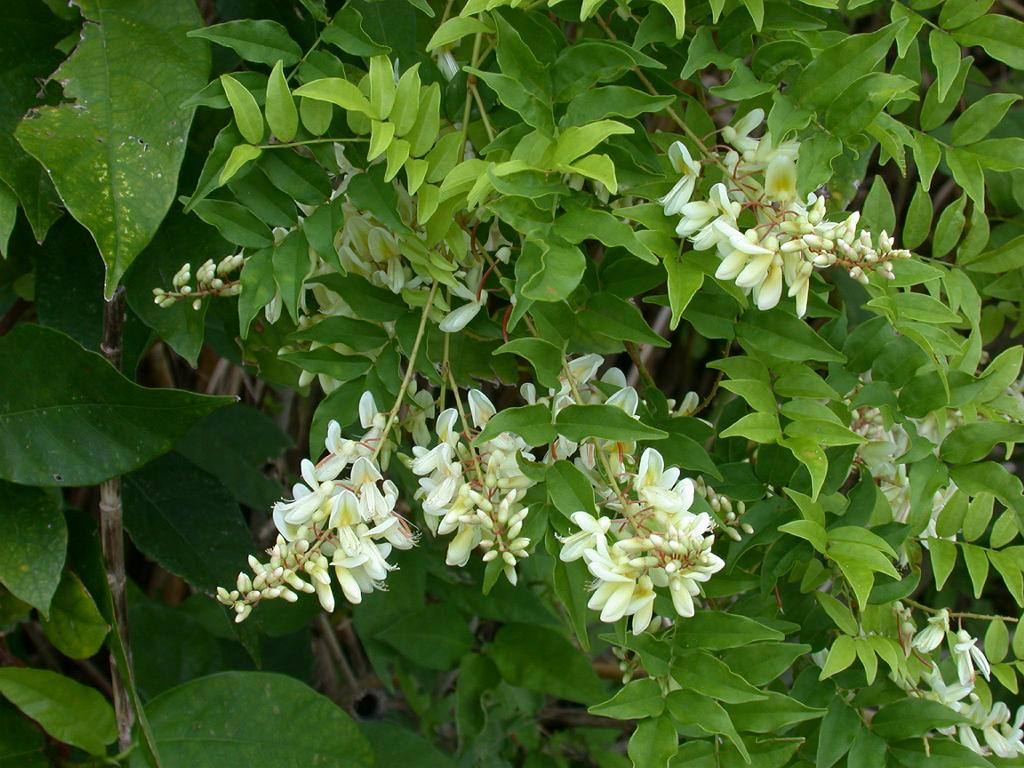
- Wisteriopsis japonica

Scientific classification
- Kingdom: Plantae
- Clade: Tracheophytes
- Clade: Angiosperms
- Clade: Eudicots
- Clade: Rosids
- Order: Fabales
- Family: Fabaceae
- Subfamily: Faboideae
- Tribe: Wisterieae
- Genus: Wisteriopsis; J.Compton & Schrire (2019)

Type species
- Wisteriopsis japonica (Siebold & Zucc.) J.Compton & Schrire ≡ Wisteria japonica Siebold & Zucc.

Species
- 5; See text.

= Wisteriopsis =

Genus of flowering plants

Wisteriopsis is a genus of flowering plants belonging to the family Fabaceae. Its native range is China to Indo-China and Temperate Eastern Asia. Wisteriopsis species are twining woody vines, generally resembling species of Wisteria. The genus was established in 2019 as a result of a molecular phylogenetic study, and includes species formerly placed in Millettia or Callerya.

== Description ==
Species of Wisteriopsis are twining woody vines, up to 4–18 m (13–59 ft) high, with greyish brown or brown stems. They climb over shrubs or sprawl over rocks. The leaves are either deciduous or more often evergreen, with about 7–15 leaflets arranged in opposite pairs plus a terminal leaflet. The flowers are arranged in panicles, or sometimes racemes in the leaf axils. Individual flowers are 7–16 mm (0.3–0.6 in) long; the inflorescences are about 8–40 cm (3–16 in) long. The five lobed calyx has a ring of fine hairs at the mouth so that the margin of each sepal is ciliate. Each flower has the typical shape of members of the family Fabaceae. The standard or banner petal is white, sometimes with a greenish, pink or purple flush, and has a yellow or green nectar guide inside. The wing and keel petals are equal in length, 5–13 mm (0.2–0.5 in) long, with a prominent claw at the base. When the flowers open, the wing petals are free from the keel and the staminal column is visible between the wings and the keel. Nine of the stamens are fused together at the base, the other is free. The seed pods are 65–125 mm (2.6–4.9 in) long and 8–30 mm (0.3–1.2 in) wide, dark brown when ripe, splitting explosively to release the smooth brown seeds.

== Taxonomy ==
The genus Wisteriopsis was established in 2019 as a result of a molecular phylogenetic study of genera related to Callerya. Some species previously placed in Millettia or Callerya were found not to belong with the type species of those genera, but to form a separate clade, which became the basis of Wisteriopsis. The name is derived from Wisteria and -opsis, meaning 'like Wisteria'. The type species is Wisteriopsis japonica (basionym Wisteria japonica). Wisteriopsis was placed in the expanded tribe Wisterieae.

Wisteriopsis is most closely related to the genus Nanhaia. Both genera are distinguished by a ring of hairs surrounding the rim of the calyx. Wisteriopsis has glabrous (hairless) ovaries, whereas Nanhaia has densely hairy ovaries. Wisteriopsis has smaller flowers, usually 7–15 mm (0.3–0.6 in) long rather than 15–35 mm (0.6–1.4 in) long.

=== Species ===
As of January 2023, Plants of the World Online accepted five species:

- Wisteriopsis championii (Benth.) J.Compton & Schrire
- Wisteriopsis eurybotrya (Drake) J.Compton & Schrire
- Wisteriopsis japonica (Siebold & Zucc.) J.Compton & Schrire
- Wisteriopsis kiangsiensis (Z.Wei) J.Compton & Schrire
- Wisteriopsis reticulata (Benth.) J.Compton & Schrire

== Distribution ==
Wisteriopsis species are native to eastern temperate and tropical Asia: central and southeastern China, Hainan, Japan, Korea, Laos, the Ryukyu Islands, Taiwan, Thailand and Vietnam. One species, Wisteriopsis reticulata, has been introduced into Florida.
