= Sigmoidala =

Scientific classification
- Kingdom: Plantae
- Clade: Tracheophytes
- Clade: Angiosperms
- Clade: Eudicots
- Clade: Rosids
- Order: Fabales
- Family: Fabaceae
- Subfamily: Faboideae
- Tribe: Wisterieae
- Genus: Sigmoidala; J.Compton & Schrire (2019)
- Species: S. kityana

Binomial name
- Sigmoidala kityana (Craib) J.Compton & Schrire (2019)

Synonyms
- Callerya kityana (Craib) Schot (1994); Millettia kityana Craib (1927)

Genus of plants

Sigmoidala is a monotypic genus of flowering plants in the family Fabaceae, first established in 2019. Its only species is Sigmoidala kityana, native to Myanmar, northern Thailand and Laos. It was first described by William Grant Craib in 1927 as Millettia kityana.

== Description ==
Sigmoidala kityana is a robust woody twining vine. Its young stems are very dark green. Its leaves are evergreen and generally have 6–8 pairs of leaflets plus a terminal leaflet. The inflorescence is a robust terminal panicle 20–50 cm (8 in – 1 ft 8 in) long, with many flowers. Individual flowers are 16–20 mm (0.6–0.8 in) long and have the general shape of members of the subfamily Faboideae. The standard petal is 10–12 mm (0.4–0.5 in) long by 12–13 mm (0.5 in) wide. Its inner surface is white flushed pink with a broad golden-yellow nectar guide. The wing petals are longer than the keel at 10–14 mm (0.4–0.6 in) long by 3 mm (0.1 in) wide, but are curved towards the end and so appear shorter. They have short basal claws. The keel petals are 10–12 mm (0.4–0.5 in) long by 4–6 mm (0.2 in) wide. Nine of the stamens are fused together, the other is free; all curve upwards at the apex. The flattened seed pods are 7–11 cm (2.8–4.3 in) long by 1–2 cm (0.4–0.8 in) wide, splitting to release the seeds, of which there are generally 1–5, occasionally up to 8.

== Taxonomy ==
The species was first described as Millettia kityana by William Grant Craib in 1927. Anne M. Schot transferred it to Callerya in 1995. A 2019 molecular phylogenetic study showed that it fell outside the clade containing the type species of Callerya, and established the new genus Sigmoidala for this species. The generic name refers to the sigmoid-shaped wing petals. Its closest relatives are Endosamara and Sarcodum, from which it can be distinguished in a number of ways. The wing petals of Sigmoidala are unique within the tribe Wisterieae in having a sigmoid shape, bent sharply back at the midpoint before extending forwards again. The flattened seed pods of Sigmoidala are shorter than those of Endosamara and also differ from the sausage-shaped pods of Sarcodum.

== Distribution and habitat ==
As of January 2023, Plants of the World Online listed the distribution of Sigmoidala kityana as Myanmar to north and north-eastern Thailand and Laos, growing primarily in the seasonally dry tropical biome. Compton et al. (2019) state that it only occurs in a narrow region of northern and north-eastern Thailand, where it climbs among dry forest trees in partial sunlight at elevations up to 400 m (1,300 ft).
