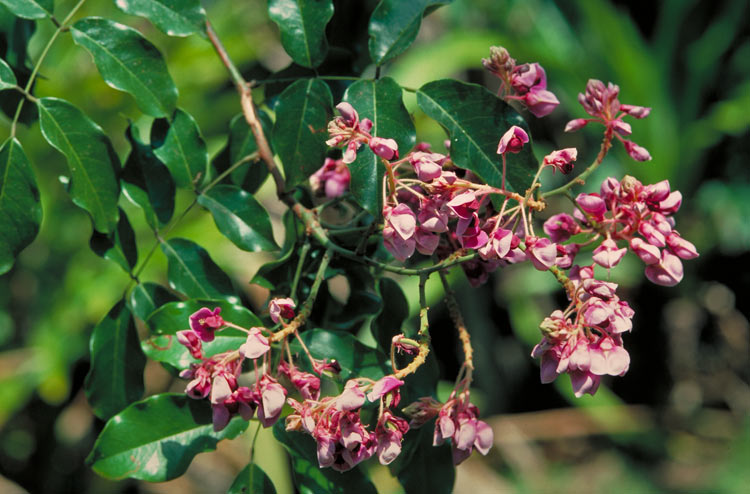

Scientific classification
- Kingdom: Plantae
- Clade: Tracheophytes
- Clade: Angiosperms
- Clade: Eudicots
- Clade: Rosids
- Order: Fabales
- Family: Fabaceae
- Subfamily: Faboideae
- Genus: Austrocallerya
- Species: A. pilipes

Binomial name
- Austrocallerya pilipes (F.M.Bailey) J.Compton & Schrire

Synonyms
- Callerya pilipes (F.M.Bailey) Schot; Millettia pilipes F.M.Bailey; Wisteria pilipes (F.M.Bailey)

= Austrocallerya pilipes =

Species of plant

Austrocallerya pilipes, synonym Callerya pilipes, is a species of flowering plant in the family Fabaceae, endemic to Queensland, Australia. It is a robust twining vine, climbing up trees and shrubs. It is known as the northern wistaria.

== Description ==
Like the other species of Austrocallerya, A. pilipes is a robust, twining woody vine. It has evergreen leaves with 4–18 paired leaflets plus a terminal leaflet. Its flowers are arranged in a robust many-flowered terminal panicle. A. pilipes can be distinguished from the other species in the genus by its larger floral bracts, more than 8 mm (0.3 in) long and wide, as opposed to at most 2 mm (0.1 in) wide, which enclose the flower buds before the flower opens. Also, the surface of the seed pod lacks longitudinal ridges or grooves.

== Taxonomy ==
The species was first described by Frederick Manson Bailey in 1890 as Millettia pilipes. It was placed in the genus Callerya as Callerya pilipes by Anne M. Schot in 1994. A 2019 molecular phylogenetic study found that it did not belong either in the genus Millettia or in the genus Callerya, and placed it in a newly established genus Austrocallerya within an expanded tribe Wisterieae.

== Distribution and habitat ==
Austrocallerya pilipes is endemic to Queensland, where it occurs in rainforest, climbing up trees and over scrub at elevations from 300 to 1,200 m (1,000 to 3,900 ft).

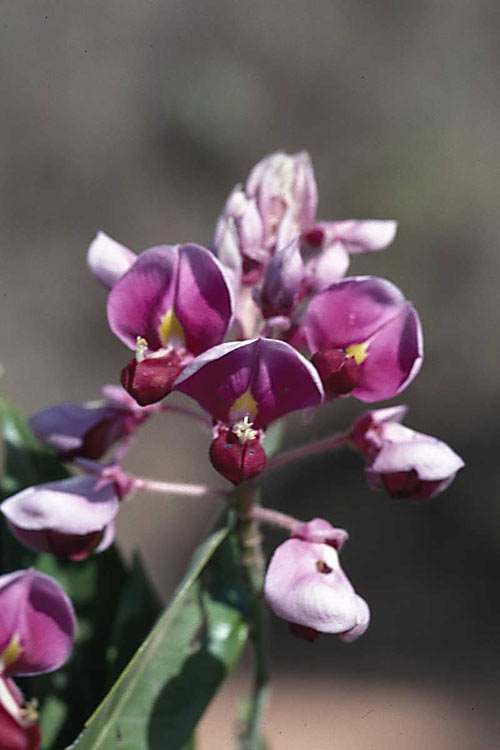
