= Sarcodum =

Scientific classification
- Kingdom: Plantae
- Clade: Tracheophytes
- Clade: Angiosperms
- Clade: Eudicots
- Clade: Rosids
- Order: Fabales
- Family: Fabaceae
- Subfamily: Faboideae
- Tribe: Wisterieae
- Genus: Sarcodum; Lour.

Type species
- Sarcodum scandens Lour.

Species
- See text.

Genus of legumes

Sarcodum is a genus of flowering plants in the legume family, Fabaceae. It belongs to the subfamily Faboideae, tribe Wisterieae. Its three species are twining vines growing over shrubs, and are native from southeast mainland China to the Solomon Islands.

== Description ==
Sarcodum species are twining vines that scramble over shrubs, growing up to 5–10 m (16–33 ft) high. The mature stems are reddish brown. The leaves have 8–44 leaflets arranged in pairs, plus a terminal leaflet. Individual leaflets may be up to 4.5 cm (1.8 in) long by 2.5 cm (1.0 in) wide. The inflorescences are composed of erect leafy axillary and terminal racemes 3–12 cm (1.2–4.7 in) long. Each flower is 6–19 mm (0.2–0.7 in) long, and has the typical shape of a member of the family Fabaceae. The pink or pinkish lilac standard petal is 10–13 mm (0.4–0.5 in) long by 6–8 mm (0.2–0.3 in) wide with a broad, dark yellow nectar guide. The wing petals are 8–13 mm (0.3–0.5 in) long by 3 mm (0.1 in) across, either much or slightly shorter than the keel petals, and with short basal claws. The keel petals are 13 mm (0.5 in) long by 4 mm (0.2 in) wide. Nine of the stamens are fused together, the tenth is free; all curve upwards at the apex. The seed pods are up to 5 cm (2.0 in) long, initially green, then black and hard when ripe, splitting to release the 4–10 seeds.

== Taxonomy ==
The genus Sarcodum was established by João de Loureiro in 1790. The genus name is derived from the Greek σαρκώδης (sarkōdēs) 'fleshy', referring to the seed pod. A 2019 molecular phylogenetic confirmed the monophyly of the genus, placing it in the tribe Wisterieae. Sarcodum is most closely related to Endosamara and Sigmoidala but has smaller leaflets – mostly less than 2.5 cm (1 in) wide as opposed to mostly 2.5–7 cm (1.0–2.8 in) wide in the other two genera. Its inflorescences are leafy racemes rather than larger erect panicles.

=== Species ===
As of January 2023, Plants of the World Online accepted three genera:

- Sarcodum bicolor Adema
- Sarcodum scandens Lour.
- Sarcodum solomonense R.Clark

== Distribution and habitat ==
The three species of Sarcodum are native to southeast mainland China and Hainan, Vietnam and Laos, and south to Java, the Lesser Sunda Islands, the Maluku Islands, the Philippines, Sulawesi and the Solomon Islands. The species grow in low thickets from sea level to 300 m (1,000 ft).
