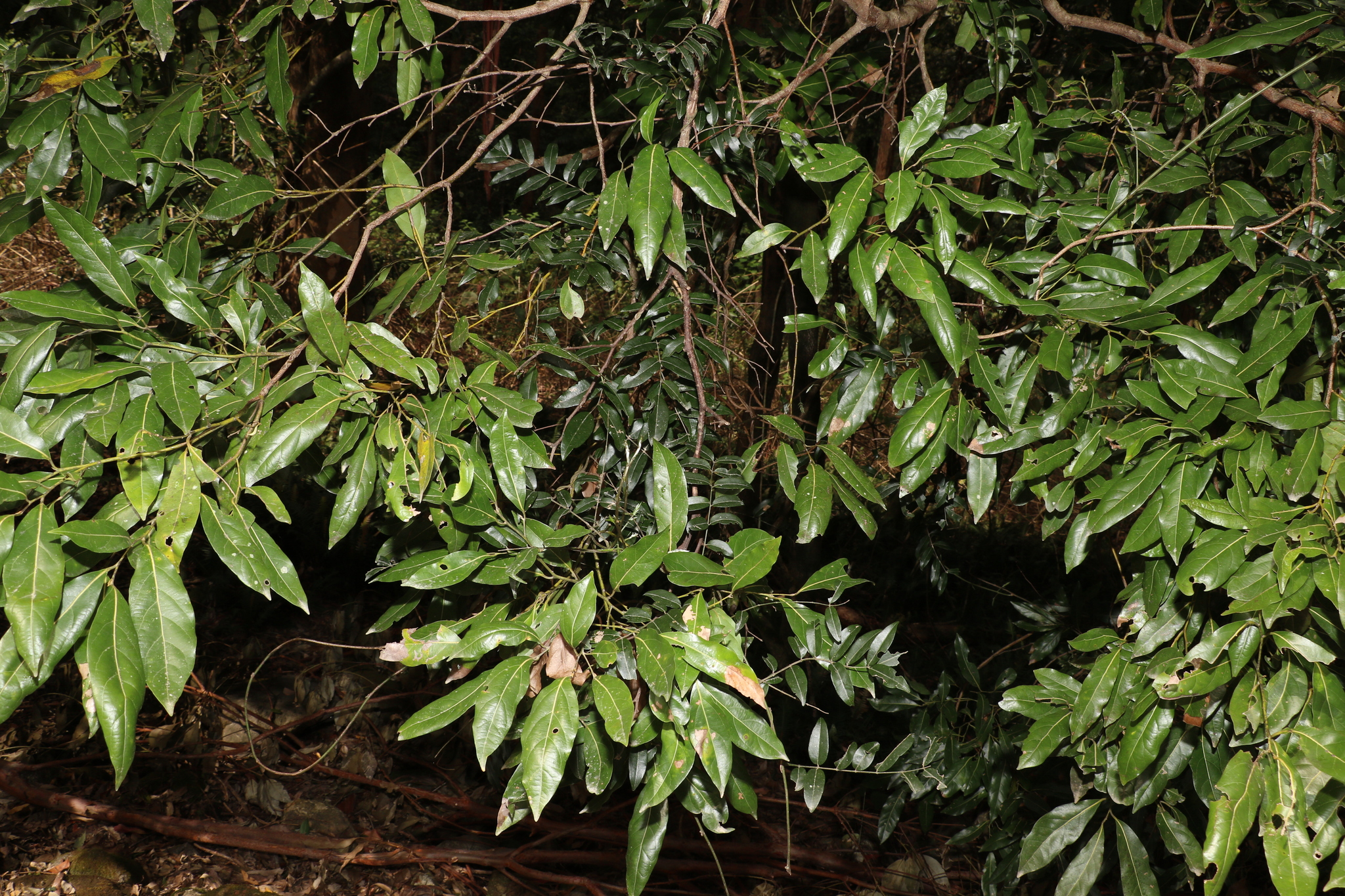

Scientific classification
- Kingdom: Plantae
- Clade: Tracheophytes
- Clade: Angiosperms
- Clade: Eudicots
- Clade: Rosids
- Order: Fabales
- Family: Fabaceae
- Subfamily: Faboideae
- Genus: Austrocallerya
- Species: A. australis

Binomial name
- Austrocallerya australis (Endl.) J.Compton & Schrire

Synonyms
- Callerya australis (Endl.) Schot; Callerya neocaledonica I.C.Nielsen & Veillon; Kraunhia australis (Endl.) Greene; Millettia australis (Endl.) Benth.; Millettia maideniana F.M.Bailey; Pterocarpus australis Endl.; Wisteria australis (Endl.) F.Muell.; Wisteria maideniana (F.M.Bailey) C.Moore

= Austrocallerya australis =

Species of plant

Austrocallerya australis, commonly known as native wisteria, blunt wisteria or Samson's sinew in Australia, is a species of flowering plant in the family Fabaceae, native to north-eastern Australia, New Guinea and some Pacific Islands. It is a tall, woody climber with pinnate leaves, the leaflets oblong, elliptic or egg-shaped, and panicles of purple, pea-like flowers.

== Description ==
Austrocallerya australis is a tall, woody climber with stems up to 20 cm (7.9 in) in diameter with rough, grey or cream-coloured bark. The leaves are pinnate with 5 to 19 oblong, elliptic or egg-shaped leaflets, 10–86 mm (0.39–3.39 in) long and 5–45 mm (0.20–1.77 in) wide. There is a silky-hairy, thread-like or triangular stipel 1–4 mm (0.039–0.157 in) long at the base of each leaflet, but that sometimes falls as the leaf matures. The petiole is 100–150 mm (3.9–5.9 in) long with egg-shaped or narrowly triangular stipules at the base, and the stalk of each leaflet is 2–3 mm (0.079–0.118 in) long. The flowers are arranged in panicles 60–260 mm (2.4–10.2 in) long, each flower on a pedicel 3–12 mm (0.12–0.47 in) long with narrowly triangular, thread-like or egg-shaped bracts at the base, but that fall as the flowers open. The sepals are yellowish, 3.5–7 mm (0.14–0.28 in) long and 5–10 mm (0.20–0.39 in) wide. The standard petal is more or less round, 12–15 mm (0.47–0.59 in) long, 11–18 mm (0.43–0.71 in) wide and mauve, purple or whitish, the wings 12–14 mm (0.47–0.55 in) long and purple or maroon, and the keel is 12–14 mm (0.47–0.55 in) long and purple or maroon. Flowering occurs in winter and spring and the fruit is an oblong, woody glabrous pod 15–25 mm (0.59–0.98 in) long.

== Taxonomy ==
This species was first formally described in 1833 by Stephan Endlicher who gave it the name Pterocarpus australis in his book Prodromus Florae Norfolkicae from specimens collected on Norfolk Island by Ferdinand Bauer. In 1994, Anne M. Schot moved the species to Callerya as Callerya australis in the journal Blumea and in 2019, James A. Compton and Brian David Schrire moved it to their new genus Austrocallerya as Austrocallerya australis, based on the plant's morphology, and nuclear and chloroplast DNA sequences. The specific epithet (australis) means "southern".

== Distribution and habitat ==
This species grows in rainforest from sea level to an altitude of 800 m (2,600 ft) in North Queensland, in New South Wales as far south as Port Macquarie, and on Norfolk Island. According to Plants of the World Online, it also occurs in New Guinea, New Caledonia, and the Cook, Solomon, Tuamotus and Tubuai Islands.

== Conservation status ==
Austrocallerya australis is listed as "least concern" under the Queensland Government Nature Conservation Act 1992.
