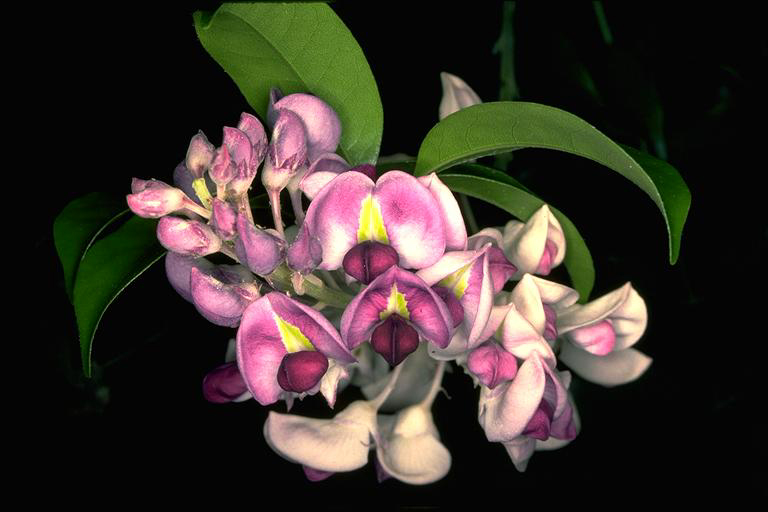
- Austrocallerya megasperma in the Australian National Botanic Gardens

Scientific classification
- Kingdom: Plantae
- Clade: Tracheophytes
- Clade: Angiosperms
- Clade: Eudicots
- Clade: Rosids
- Order: Fabales
- Family: Fabaceae
- Subfamily: Faboideae
- Tribe: Wisterieae
- Genus: Austrocallerya; J.Compton & Schrire

Synonyms
- Millettia sect. Austromillettia Dunn

= Austrocallerya =

Genus of flowering plants

Austrocallerya is a genus of flowering plants belonging to the subfamily Faboideae in the family Fabaceae. They are robust, twining woody vines.

Its native range is from New Guinea to eastern Australia and islands in the Southern Pacific.

== Description ==
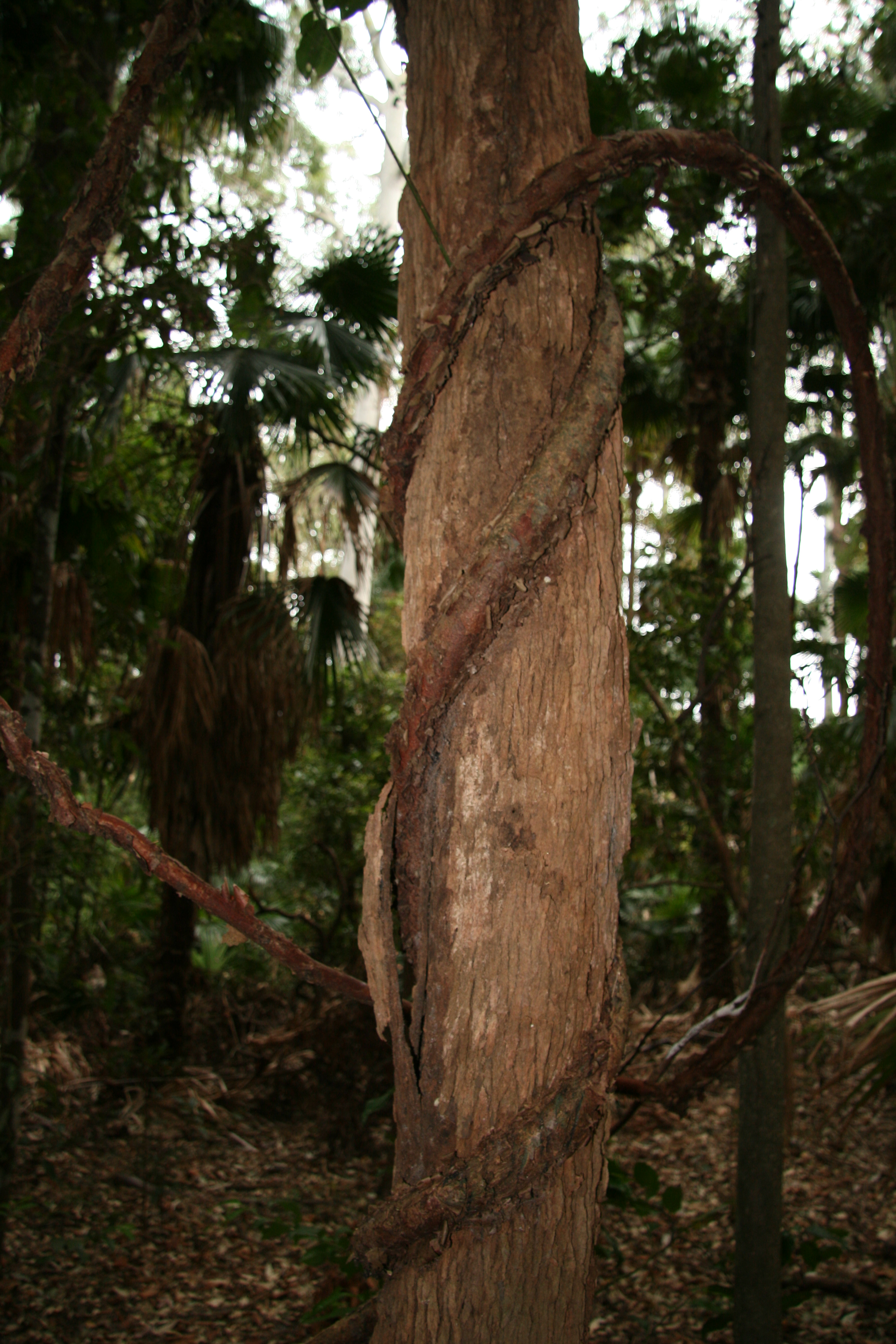
Austrocallerya megasperma growing around a tree trunk

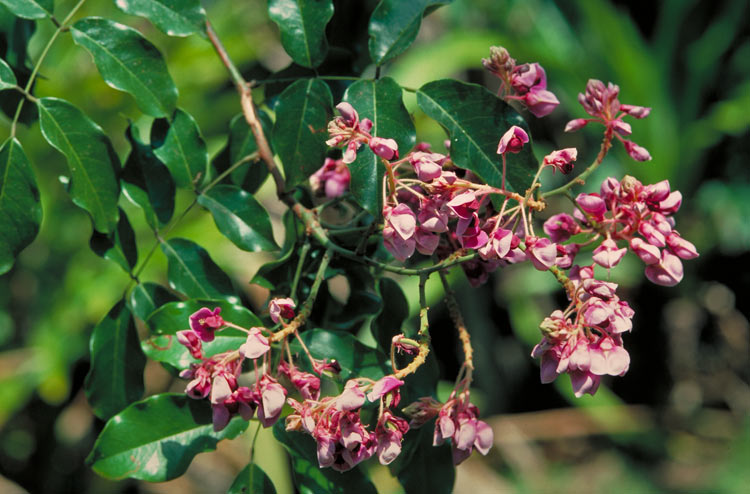
Austrocallerya pilipes

Species of Austrocallerya are a robust twining woody vines, reaching 2–20 m (7–66 ft) high. The mature stems have flaky, peeling bark. The leaves are evergreen and generally have 4–18 paired leaflets plus a terminal leaflet. The leaflets are 3–14 cm (1.2–5.5 in) long by 1–7 cm (0.4–2.8 in) wide. The robust inflorescence is a many-flowered terminal panicle, 6–40 cm (2–16 in) long. The individual flowers are 11–16 mm (0.4–0.6 in) long and have the general shape of members of the subfamily Faboideae. The standard petal is 12–22 mm (0.5–0.9 in) long by 11–18 mm (0.4–0.7 in) wide and of various colours from whitish to purple, with a greenish yellow or lime green nectar guide. The purple or maroon wing petals are equal in length to the keel at 11–14 mm (0.4–0.6 in) long by 5–6 mm (0.2–0.2 in) wide, with short basal claws. The keel petals are 11–14 mm (0.4–0.6 in) long by 4–6 mm (0.2–0.2 in) wide, united into a cup. They are dark reddish, purple or maroon in two of the species and white with purple tips in A. megasperma. Nine of the stamens are fused together, the other is free; all curve upwards at the apex. The inflated seed pods are 7–23 cm (2.8–9.1 in) long by 3–5.2 cm (1.2–2.0 in) wide, with hollow cavities holding generally 2–6 seeds.

== Taxonomy ==
In 1912, Stephen Troyte Dunn recognized the distinctiveness of three Australasian species then placed in the genus Millettia, and created a separate section, Austromillettia, for them. A 2019 molecular phylogenetic study found that the three species did not belong either in the genus Millettia or in the genus Callerya where they had later been placed, but instead formed a distinct clade, sister to Padbruggea, within a newly expanded tribe Wisterieae. Accordingly, the genus Austrocallerya was established. The genus name refers to the southern hemisphere distribution of the species and their former placement in Callerya.

Austrocallerya species can be distinguished from Padbruggea by a number of features, including the more upright inflorescences, the broader standard petals, and the more linear seed pods.

=== Species ===
As of January 2023, Plants of the World Online accepted three species:

- Austrocallerya australis (Endl.) J.Compton & Schrire
- Austrocallerya megasperma (F.Muell.) J.Compton & Schrire
- Austrocallerya pilipes (F.M.Bailey) J.Compton & Schrire

== Distribution ==
Austrocallerya species are native to New Guinea, Queensland and New South Wales in eastern Australia, and various islands in the Southern Pacific (the Cook Islands, New Caledonia, Norfolk Island, the Solomon Islands, the Tuamotus and Tubuai).
