= Kanburia =

Scientific classification
- Kingdom: Plantae
- Clade: Embryophytes
- Clade: Tracheophytes
- Clade: Angiosperms
- Clade: Eudicots
- Clade: Rosids
- Order: Fabales
- Family: Fabaceae
- Subfamily: Faboideae
- Tribe: Wisterieae
- Genus: Kanburia; J.Compton, Mattapha, Sirich. & Schrire

Type species
- Kanburia chlorantha (Mattapha & Sirich.) J.Compton, Mattapha, Sirich. & Schrire ≡ Callerya chlorantha Mattapha & Sirich.

Species
- See text.

Genus of flowering plants

Kanburia is a genus of flowering plant in the family Fabaceae, native to Thailand. The genus was established in 2019. Kanburia species are twining woody vines.

== Description ==
Kanburia species are robust twining woody vines. Their young stems are covered with soft hairs (pubescent). Their leaves are evergreen and generally have 4 paired leaflets plus a terminal leaflet. The leaflets are 5–15 cm (2.0–5.9 in) long by 2–11 cm (0.8–4.3 in) wide. The erect or pendulous inflorescence is a loose many-flowered terminal panicle, 20–30 cm (8–12 in) long. The individual flowers are 10–15 mm (0.4–0.6 in) long and have the general shape of members of the subfamily Faboideae. The standard petal is 8–10 mm (0.3–0.4 in) long by 8–10 mm (0.3–0.4 in) wide. In K. chlorantha, the standard has a pale green inner surface with a dark green nectar guide. In K. tenasserimensis, the inner surface of the standard is dark purple to maroon with a pale yellow nectar guide. The wing petals are about the same length as the keel at 7–8 mm (0.3–0.3 in) long by 3 mm (0.1 in) wide, with short basal claws. The keel petals are 6–7 mm (0.2–0.3 in) long by 3–3.5 mm (0.1 in) wide, united into a long cup. Nine of the stamens are fused together, the other is free; all curve upwards at the apex. The flattened seed pods are 5–13 cm (2.0–5.1 in) long by 1–1.8 cm (0.4–0.7 in) wide, splitting when ripe to release their 1–6 seeds.

== Taxonomy ==
The genus Kanburia was established in 2019 following a molecular phylogenetic study which showed that two species that had placed in Callerya when first described in 2016 did not belong with the type species of that genus. The genus name refers to Kanburi, the old name for the province of Kanchanaburi in western Thailand where the type species, K. chlorantha, was discovered.

Kanburia is placed in the tribe Wisterieae, where it forms a clade with the genera Afgekia, Callerya, Serawaia and Whitfordiodendron. The evidence for the separation of Kanburia is primarily molecular.

=== Species ===
As of December 2022, Plants of the World Online accepted two species:

- Kanburia chlorantha (Mattapha & Sirich.) J.Compton, Mattapha, Sirich. & Schrire
- Kanburia tenasserimensis (Mattapha & Sirich.) J.Compton, Mattapha, Sirich. & Schrire
