= Endosamara =

Scientific classification
- Kingdom: Plantae
- Clade: Tracheophytes
- Clade: Angiosperms
- Clade: Eudicots
- Clade: Rosids
- Order: Fabales
- Family: Fabaceae
- Subfamily: Faboideae
- Tribe: Wisterieae
- Genus: Endosamara; R.Geesink
- Species: E. racemosa

Binomial name
- Endosamara racemosa (Roxb.) R.Geesink

Synonyms
- Millettia leiogyna Kurz (1873); Millettia orissae Panigrahi & S.C.Mishra (1985); Millettia pallida (Dalzell & A.Gibson) Dalzell (1872); Millettia racemosa (Roxb.) Benth. (1852); Phaseoloides leiogynum (Kurz) Kuntze (1891); Phaseoloides racemosum (Roxb.) Kuntze (1891); Pongamia corcor Graham (1831), not validly publ.; Pongamia racemosa Graham (1831), nom. nud.; Robinia galuga Roxb. ex Wight & Arn. (1834), pro syn.; Robinia racemosa Roxb. (1832); Tephrosia racemosa (Roxb.) Sweet ex Wight & Arn. (1834); Wisteria pallida Dalzell & A.Gibson (1861); Wisteria racemosa (Roxb.) Dalzell & A.Gibson (1861)

Genus of legumes

Endosamara is a monotypic genus of flowering plants in the legume family Fabaceae, tribe Wisterieae. Its only species is Endosamara racemosa, a liana found from South India through Indo-China to the Philippines.

== Description ==
Endosamara racemosa is a robust twining woody vine. The young stems are green and covered with soft hairs (pubescent); the mature stems are pale brown and hairless. The leaves are evergreen and generally have 6–12 paired leaflets plus a terminal leaflet. The leaflets are 5–13 cm (2.0–5.1 in) long by 2–7 cm (0.8–2.8 in) wide. The robust inflorescence is a many-flowered terminal panicle, 20–50 cm (8–20 in) long. The individual flowers are 13–16 mm (0.5–0.6 in) long and have the general shape of members of the subfamily Faboideae. The standard petal is 10–15 mm (0.4–0.6 in) long by 12–15 mm (0.5–0.6 in) wide. The inner surface is pink or pinkish purple, rarely white, with a dark greenish yellow nectar guide. The wing petals are slightly longer than the keel at 12–13 mm (0.5–0.5 in) long by 3–5 mm (0.1–0.2 in) wide, with short basal claws. The keel petals are 10–12 mm (0.4–0.5 in) long by 4–6 mm (0.2–0.2 in) wide, united into a cup. Nine of the stamens are fused together, the other is free; all curve upwards at the apex. The flattened seed pods are 8–25 cm (3.1–9.8 in) long by 1–2 cm (0.4–0.8 in) wide, black when dry, and have 4–5 seeds. A unique feature of the genus Endosamara within the tribe Wisterieae is that the pods split into one-seeded segments before releasing the seeds. Each seed is covered in a layer of endocarp which extends into a papery wing, 3–5 cm (1.2–2.0 in) long and 1 cm (0.4 in) wide.

== Taxonomy ==
Endosamara racemosa was first described by William Roxburgh in 1832 in the genus Robinia. It was later placed in a number of other genera, including Millettia and Wisteria, before in 1984 Robert Geesink established the new genus Endosamara for the species, based principally on the unique structure of the seeds, which have flat samara-like wings but are enclosed in endocarp.

Endosamara is placed in the tribe Wisterieae, where it forms the earliest diverging clade with the genera Sarcodum and Sigmoidala. The structure of the seeds distinguishes Endosamara.

== Distribution ==
Endosamara racemosa is found from South India to the Philippines, being native to Assam, Bangladesh, India, Laos, Malaya, Myanmar, the Philippines, Thailand and Vietnam.
