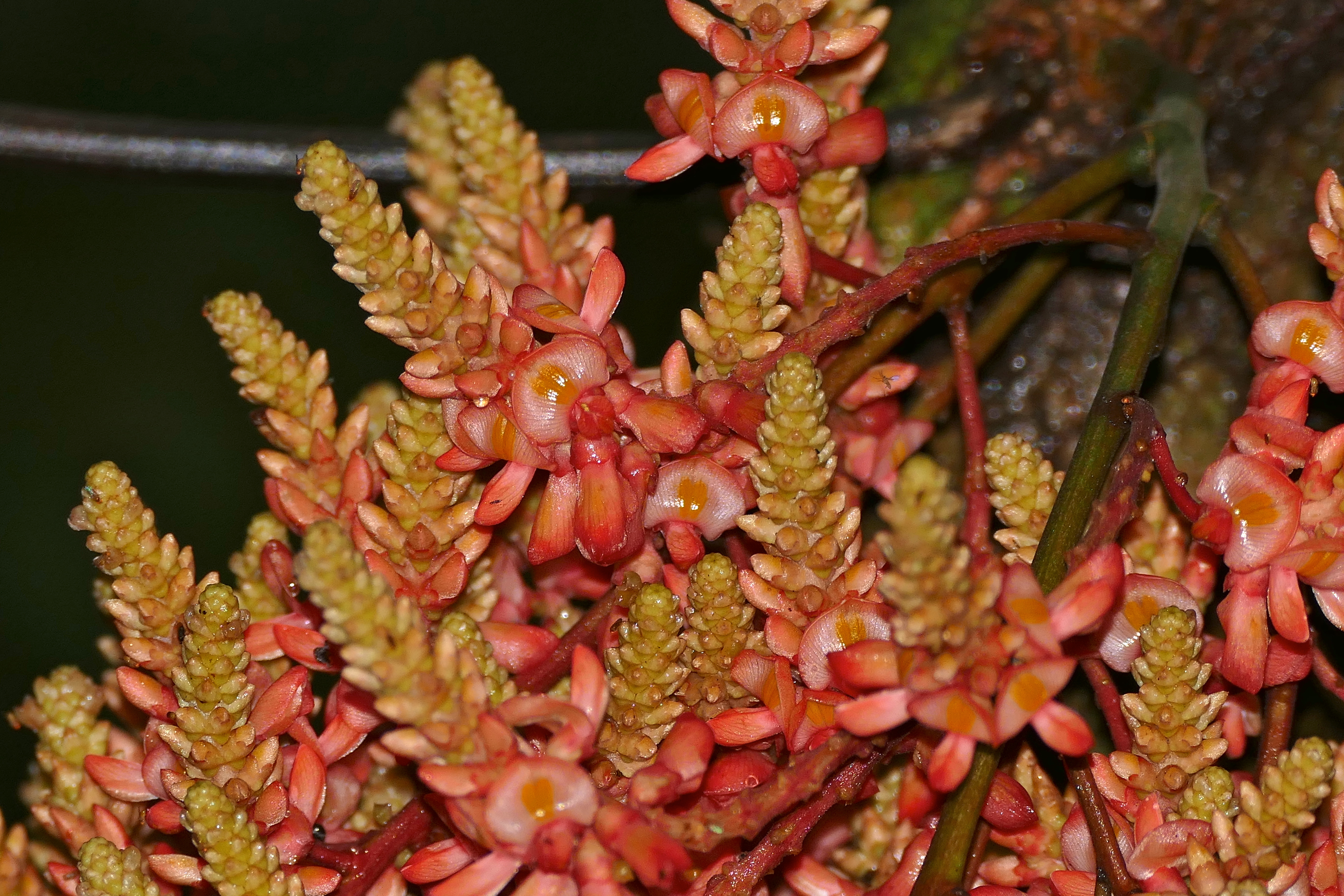

Scientific classification
- Kingdom: Plantae
- Clade: Tracheophytes
- Clade: Angiosperms
- Clade: Eudicots
- Clade: Rosids
- Order: Fabales
- Family: Fabaceae
- Subfamily: Faboideae
- Genus: Whitfordiodendron
- Species: W. nieuwenhuisii

Binomial name
- Whitfordiodendron nieuwenhuisii (J.J.Sm.) Dunn
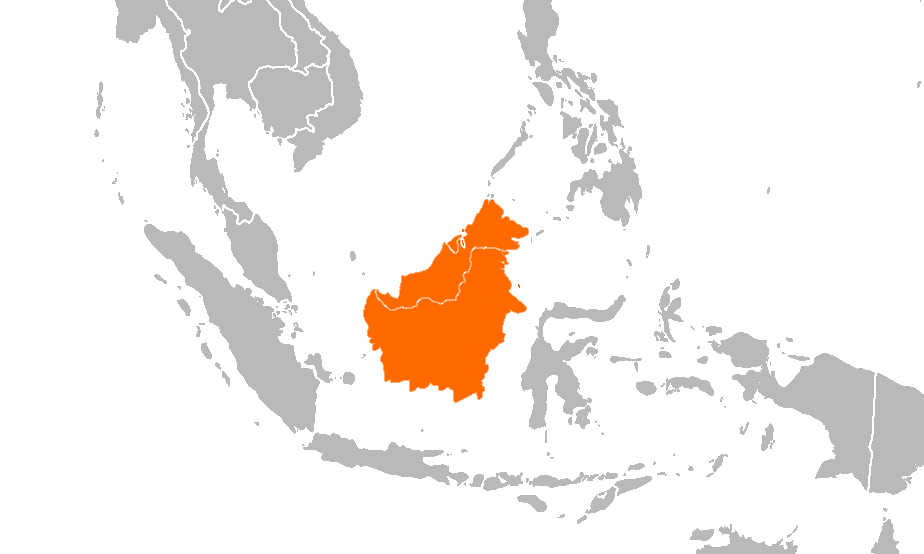
- It is native to Borneo

Synonyms
- Adinobotrys myrianthus Dunn; Adinobotrys nieuwenhuisii (J.J.Sm.) Dunn; Callerya nieuwenhuisii (J.J.Sm.) Schot; Millettia cuspidata Ridl.; Whitfordiodendron myrianthum (Dunn) Dunn; Millettia nieuwenhuisii J.J.Sm.

= Whitfordiodendron nieuwenhuisii =

Species of plant

Whitfordiodendron nieuwenhuisii is a species of flowering plant in the family Fabaceae, native to Borneo. It was first described by Johannes Jacobus Smith in 1906 as Millettia nieuwenhuisii. As with many other species now placed in the tribe Wisterieae, it has also been placed in the related genera Adinobotrys and Callerya.
