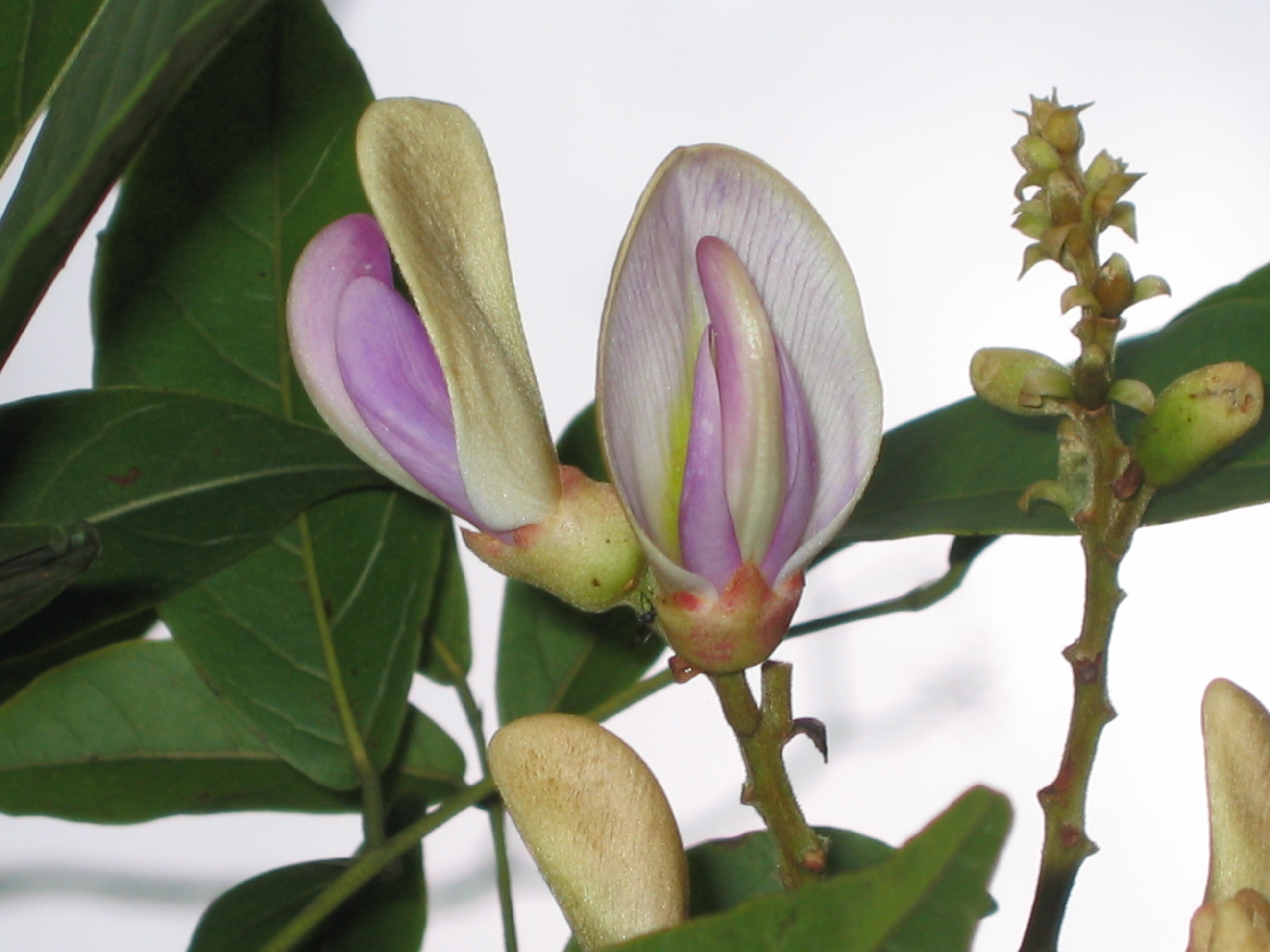
- Callerya nitida growing in Hong Kong

Scientific classification
- Kingdom: Plantae
- Clade: Tracheophytes
- Clade: Angiosperms
- Clade: Eudicots
- Clade: Rosids
- Order: Fabales
- Family: Fabaceae
- Subfamily: Faboideae
- Tribe: Wisterieae
- Genus: Callerya; Endl.

Type species
- Callerya nitida (Benth.) R.Geesink ≡ Millettia nitida Benth.

Species
- See text.

Diversity
- 12 species

Synonyms
- Marquartia Vogel, nom. illeg.

= Callerya =

Genus of legumes

Callerya is a genus of flowering plants in the legume family, Fabaceae. It belongs to the subfamily Faboideae, tribe Wisterieae. It includes 12 species native to the eastern Himalayas, Indochina, southern China and Taiwan, and Peninsular Malaysia. Its species are climbers, generally reaching up to about 1 m (3 ft) tall. The genus has a somewhat complicated taxonomic history; its circumscription was substantially revised in 2019.

== Description ==
Species of Callerya are scrambling climbers, growing over rocks or shrubs, reaching 0.5–1 m (1.6–3.3 ft) high. The leaves are evergreen and generally have 2–12 paired leaflets plus a terminal leaflet. The leaflets are usually 3–15 cm (1.2–5.9 in) long, sometimes up to 22 cm (8.7 in) long, by 2–6 cm (0.8–2.4 in) wide, sometimes up to 10 cm (3.9 in)) wide. The terminal leaflet is distinctly larger than the rest, and the basal pair usually smallest. The erect inflorescence is a terminal panicle (in C. bonatiana composed of axillary racemes), usually 6–20 cm (2–8 in) long, but sometimes up to 40 cm (15.7 in). The individual flowers are 11–25 mm (0.4–1.0 in) long and have the general shape of members of the subfamily Faboideae. The standard petal is 12–25 mm (0.5–1.0 in) long by 8–17 mm (0.3–0.7 in) wide, and is white, green, or various reddish shades from pink to mauve or violet, with a yellow or green nectar guide. The wing petals are shorter than the keel at 5–15 mm (0.2–0.6 in) long by 2–5 mm (0.1–0.2 in) wide, with short basal claws. The keel petals are 8–16 mm (0.3–0.6 in) long by 3–6 mm (0.1–0.2 in) wide, united into a cup. Nine of the stamens are fused together, the other is free; all curve upwards at the apex. The flat or inflated seed pods are 4–15 cm (1.6–5.9 in) long by 1.5–4 cm (0.6–1.6 in) wide, splitting when ripe to release usually two to five seeds.

== Taxonomy ==
The taxonomic history of the genus Callerya and its type species is somewhat complicated. In 1843, Theodor Vogel published the genus name Marquartia for a species in the family Fabaceae that he called Marquartia tomentosa. However, Justus Carl Hasskarl had published the name Marquartia in the previous year (1842) for a genus in the family Pandanaceae, so Vogel's Marquartia was an illegitimate later homonym. Callerya was published by Stephan Endlicher later in 1843, so became a replacement name for Vogel's Marquartia. The genus name commemorates Joseph-Marie Callery, a scholar, missionary and sinologist. The correct name for Vogel's Marquartia tomentosa apparently became Callerya tomentosa. However, it was later discovered that this species had already been described in 1842 by George Bentham as Millettia nitida, so the correct name in Callerya for the type species is Callerya nitida, a combination published by Robert Geesink in 1984.

The boundaries of Callerya have varied. Revisions by Geesink in 1984 and by Anne M. Schot in 1994 resulted in the genus being expanded, which continued until 33 species were recognised by 2016. Schot placed the genus in the tribe Millettieae. A 2019 molecular phylogenetic study showed that as then circumscribed, Callerya was not monophyletic, nor did it belong in Millettieae. Instead a reduced genus was placed in an expanded tribe Wisterieae, where it formed a clade with Afgekia, Kanburia, Serawaia and Whitfordiodendron, as sister to the other genera. Callerya flowers have wing petals that are shorter than the keel petals and standards that are relatively larger than in some related genera.

=== Species ===
Only five species were placed in the genus in the 2019 study. Other species which appeared to be in Callerya were not included in the study, so the exact boundaries of the revised genus were not settled. It was suggested that there might be "as many as twelve species". As of August 2023, Plants of the World Online accepted 12 species:

- Callerya cinerea (Benth.) Schot
- Callerya cochinchinensis (Gagnep.) Schot
- Callerya congestiflora (T.C.Chen) Z.Wei & Pedley
- Callerya dielsiana (Harms ex Diels) L.K.Phan ex Z.Wei & Pedley
- Callerya dorwardii (Collett & Hemsl.) Z.Wei & Pedley
- Callerya gentiliana (H.Lév.) Z.Wei & Pedley
- Callerya longipedunculata (Z.Wei) X.Y.Zhu
- Callerya nitida (Benth.) R.Geesink
- Callerya oosperma (Dunn) Z.Wei & Pedley
- Callerya sericosema (Hance) Z.Wei & Pedley
- Callerya sphaerosperma (Z.Wei) Z.Wei & Pedley
- Callerya tsui (F.P.Metcalf) Z.Wei & Pedley

=== Former species ===
Three species formerly placed in the genus have been moved to Austrocallerya:

- Callerya australis → Austrocallerya australis (Endl.) J.Compton & Schrire
- Callerya megasperma → Austrocallerya megasperma (F.Muell.) J.Compton & Schrire
- Callerya pilipes → Austrocallerya pilipes (F.M.Bailey) J.Compton & Schrire

The genera Adinobotrys, Padbruggea and Whitfordiodendron, which had been sunk into Callerya, were restored in the 2019 study. Adinobotrys is not placed in the Wisterieae, the other two are. Species affected include:

- Callerya atropurpurea → Adinobotrys atropurpureus
- Callerya dasyphylla → Padbruggea dasyphylla
- Callerya eriantha → Whitfordiodendron erianthum
- Callerya nieuwenhuisii → Whitfordiodendron nieuwenhuisii
- Callerya scandens → Whitfordiodendron scandens
- Callerya sumatrana → Whitfordiodendron sumatranum

== Distribution ==
Callerya species are native over a wide area from Nepal in the west through China to Hainan in the east and south through Indochina to Peninsular Malaysia.
