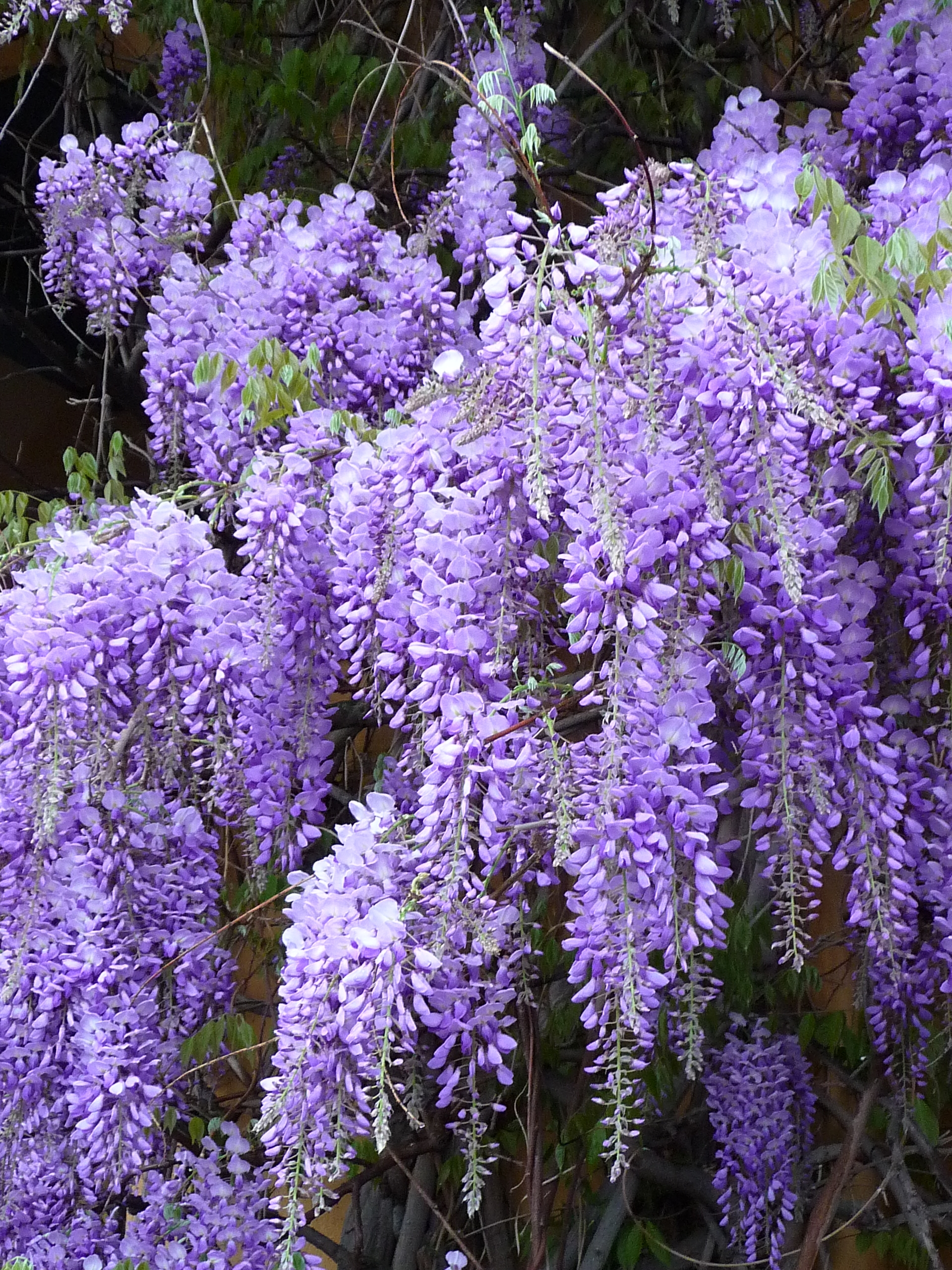
- Flowering Wisteria sinensis

Scientific classification
- Kingdom: Plantae
- Clade: Tracheophytes
- Clade: Angiosperms
- Clade: Eudicots
- Clade: Rosids
- Order: Fabales
- Family: Fabaceae
- Subfamily: Faboideae
- Clade: Meso-Papilionoideae
- Clade: Non-protein amino acid-accumulating clade
- Clade: Hologalegina
- Clade: Inverted repeat-lacking clade
- Tribe: Wisterieae; X.Y.Zhu

Genera
- See text

= Wisterieae =

Tribe of angiosperms

Wisterieae is a tribe of flowering plants in the bean family Fabaceae. The tribe was first described in 1994 for the sole genus Wisteria, but was greatly expanded in 2019 to include 13 genera, six of which were new. Five had previously been placed in the tribe Millettieae. Members of the tribe are climbers of various kinds. Some, like Wisteria, are cultivated for their flowers.

== Description ==
Members of the tribe Wisterieae are either woody lianas or sprawling climbing shrubs. All species have their flowers arranged in either true panicles or true racemes (as opposed to pseudopanicles or pseudoracemes). The tribe belongs to the Inverted repeat-lacking clade; all genera lack one 25 kilobase long copy of the inverted repeat in the chloroplast genome, distinguishing them from genera in the tribe Millettieae, which do not lack this inverted repeat.

== Taxonomy ==
The tribe was established in 1994 by X. Y. Zhu, based on features of Wisteria pollen. Most older genera that are now placed in Wisterieae were previously placed in the tribe Millettieae. As circumscribed in the 1980s, Millettieae was morphologically diverse and was later found to be polyphyletic. A number of studies separated off the "Callerya group" on both morphological and genetic grounds. In particular, unlike the rest of the broadly defined Millettieae, the Callerya group belonged to the Inverted repeat-lacking clade. A 2019 molecular phylogenetic resulted in most of the Callerya group being placed in an expanded tribe Wisterieae, which included six newly created genera. The study suggested that the genera included in the tribe could be divided into five major clades, A to E, which were related as shown in the following cladogram:

- Tribe Wisterieae
  - Clade A
    - Sarcodum
    - - Endosamara
      - Sigmoidala
  - - Clade B
      - Nanhaia
      - Wisteriopsis
    - - Clade C
        - Callerya
        - - - Serawaia
            - Whitfordiodendron
          - - Kanburia
            - Afgekia
      - - Clade D
          - Padbruggea
          - Austrocallerya
        - Clade E
          Wisteria

The monophyly of Wisterieae and its broad division into five clades was supported in a 2021 study, with some small differences in clade C. Serawaia was not included in the study, and Callerya bonatiana fell outside the genus Callerya when nuclear ribosomal DNA was used, and was placed in a new genus Villosocallerya.

=== Genera ===
In 2019, Compton et al. included 13 genera in their circumscription of the tribe:

- Afgekia Craib
- Austrocallerya J.Compton & Schrire
- Callerya Endl.
- Endosamara R.Geesink
- Kanburia J.Compton, Mattapha, Sirich. & Schrire
- Nanhaia J.Compton & Schrire
- Padbruggea Miq.
- Sarcodum Lour.
- Serawaia J.Compton & Schrire
- Sigmoidala J.Compton & Schrire
- Whitfordiodendron Elmer
- Wisteria Nutt.
- Wisteriopsis J.Compton & Schrire
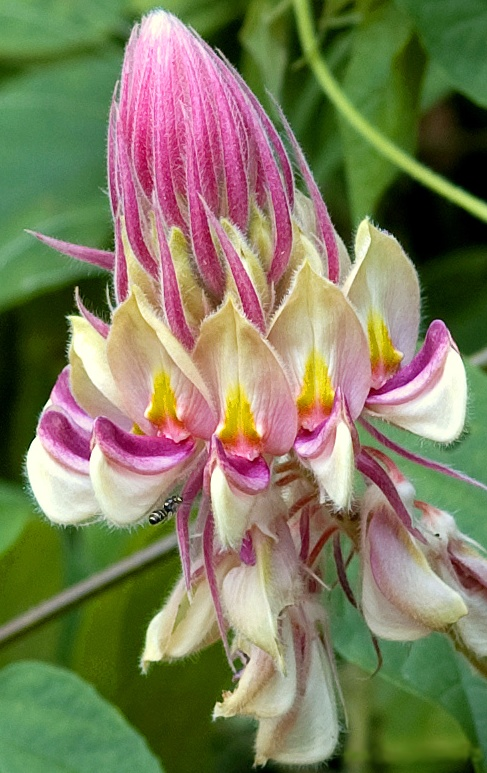
Afgekia sericea

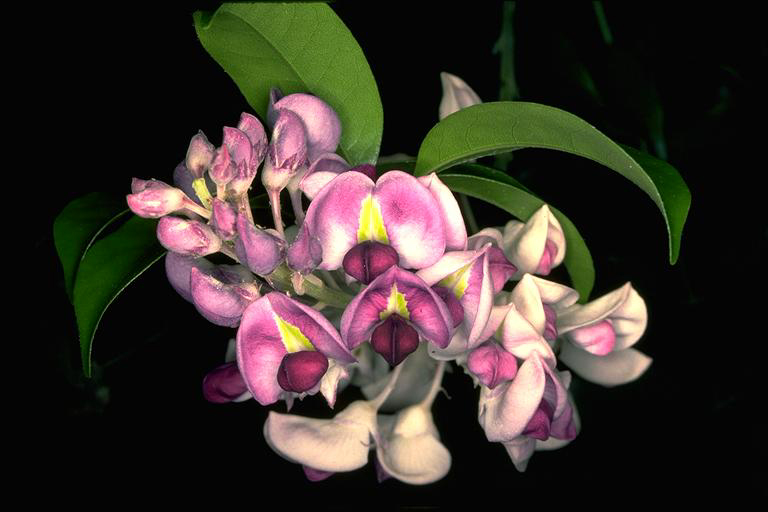
Austrocallerya megasperma flowers

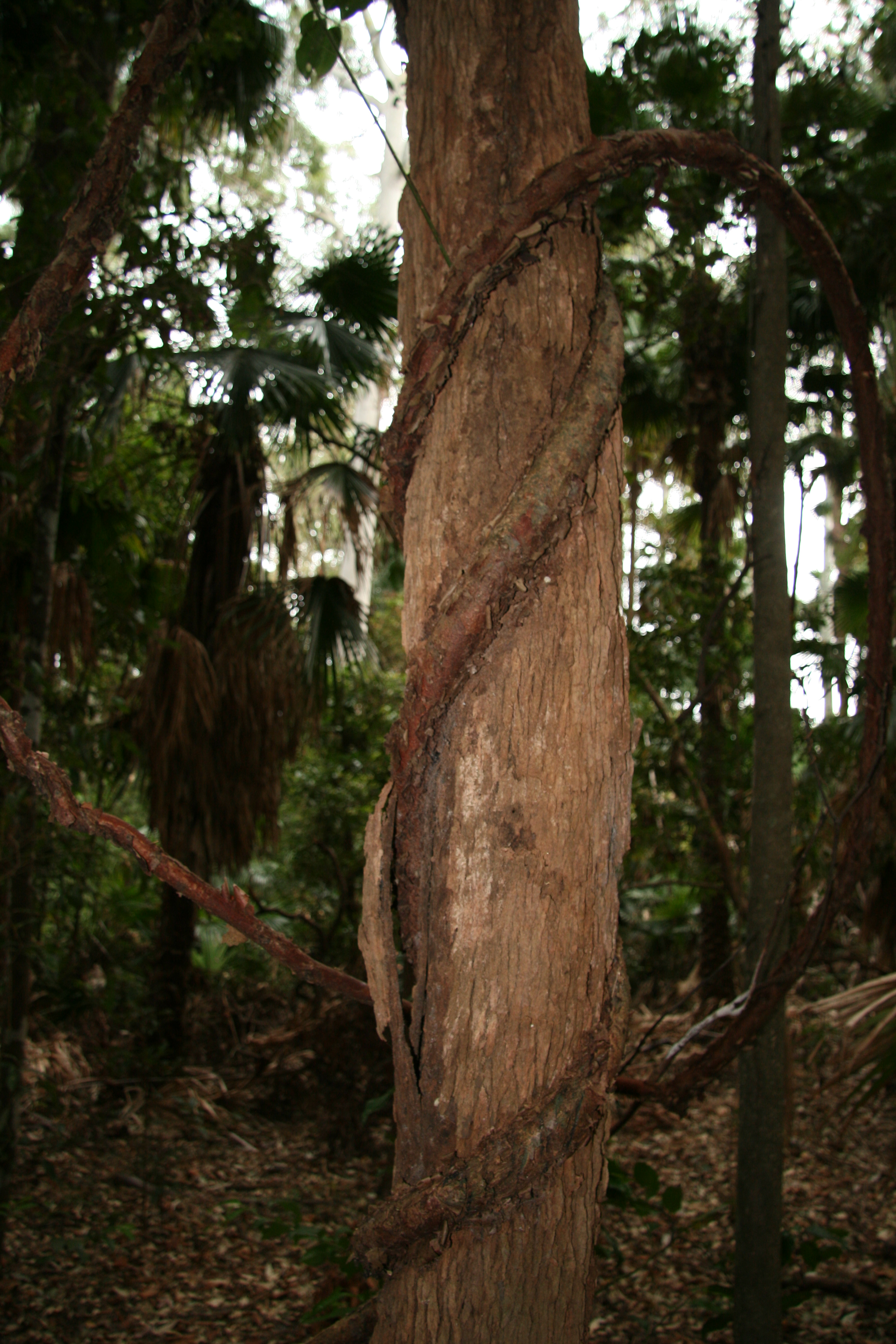
Austrocallerya megasperma around a tree trunk

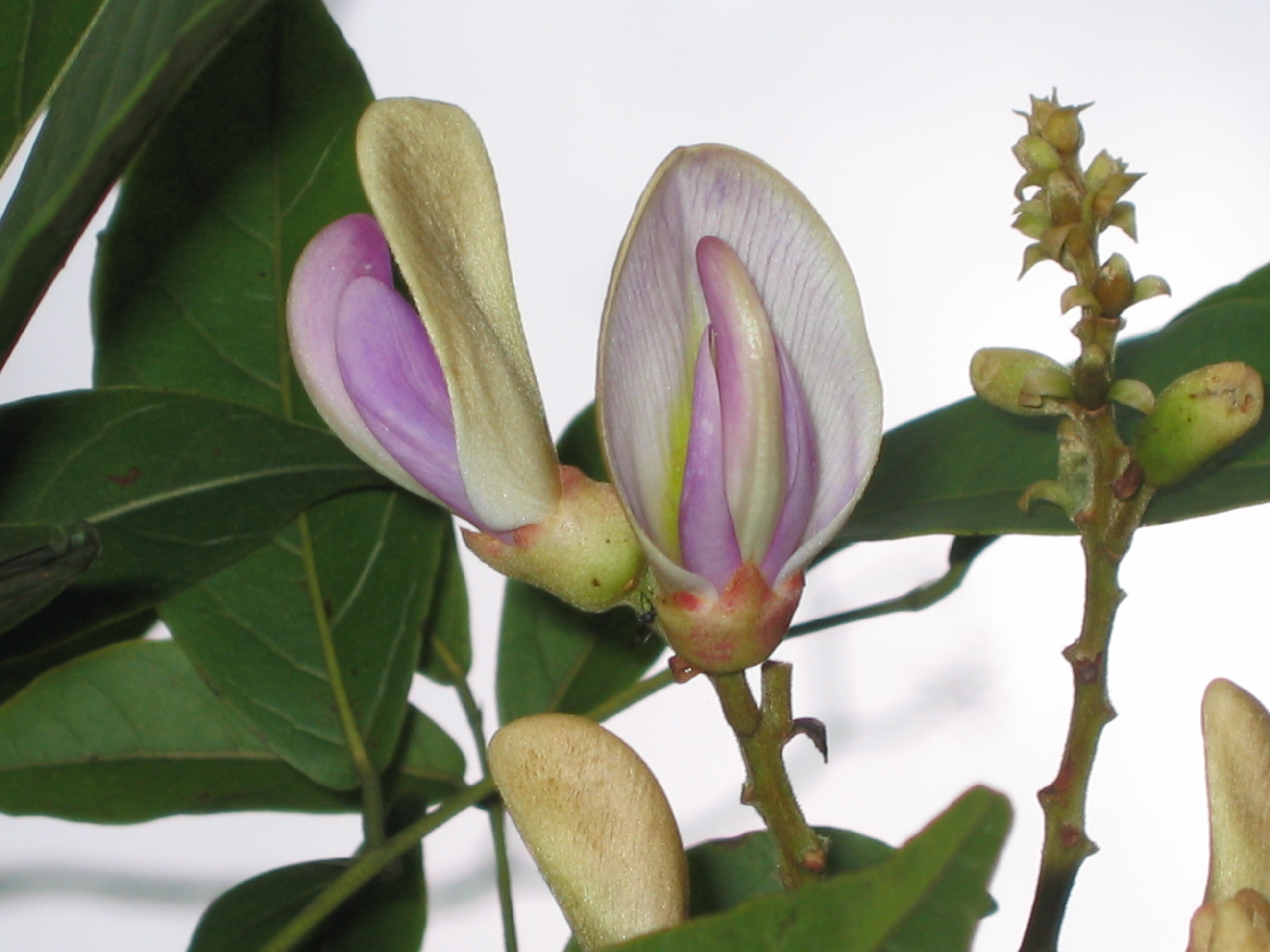
Callerya nitida

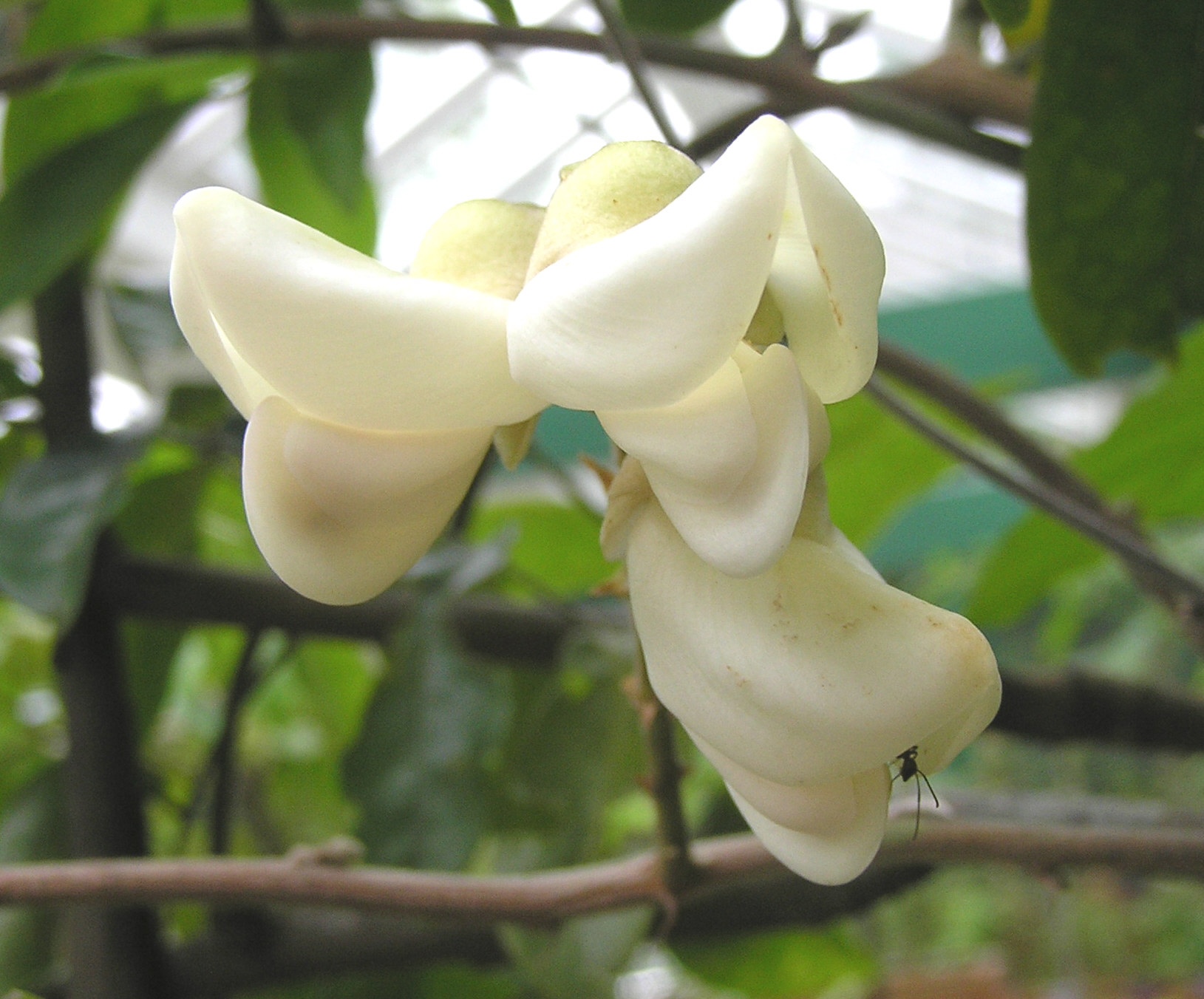
Nanhaia speciosa

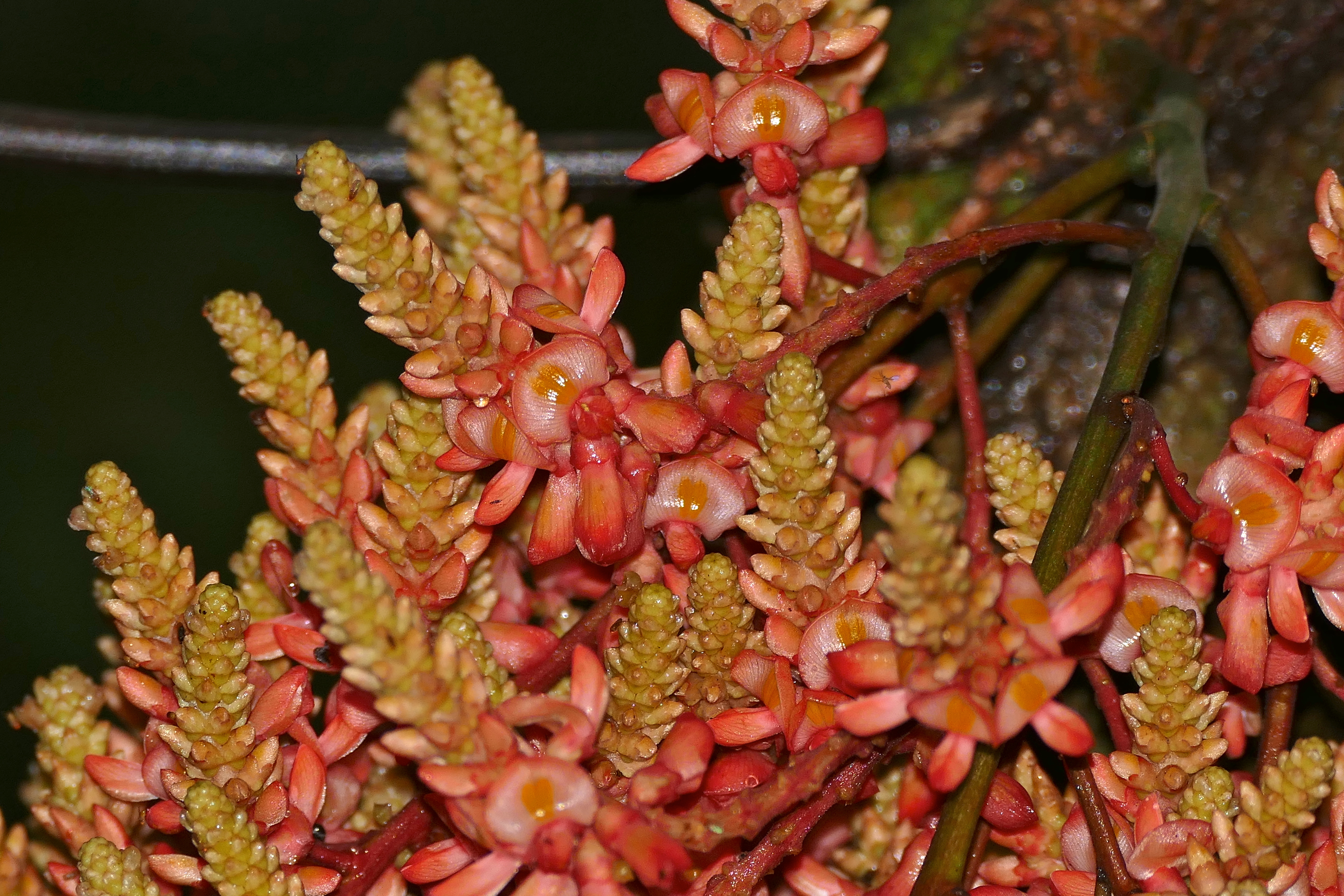
Whitfordiodendron nieuwenhuisii

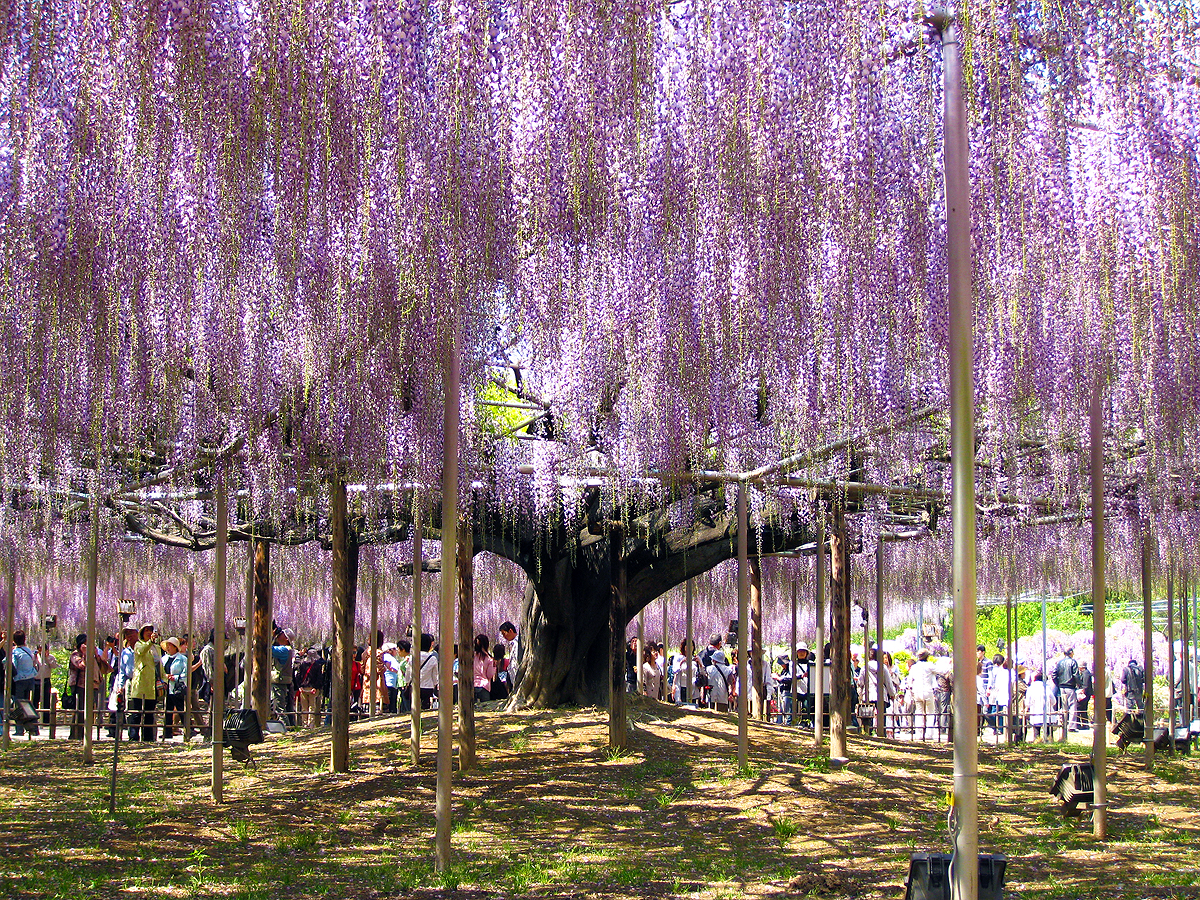
Old Wisteria floribunda in cultivation in Japan

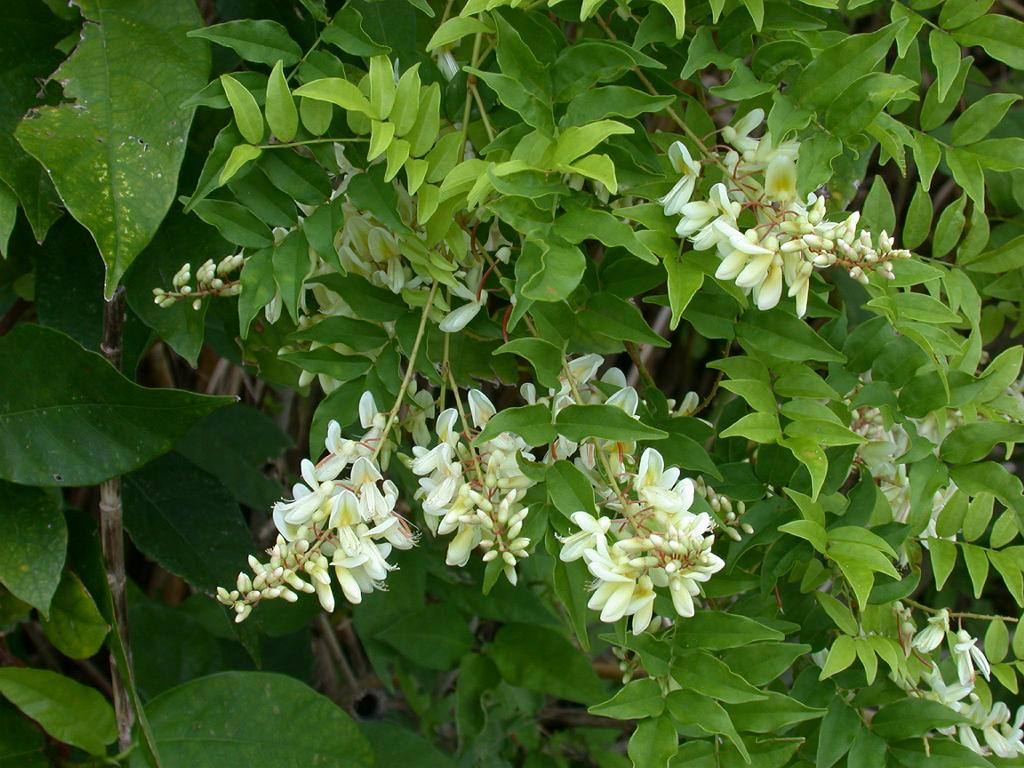
Wisteriopsis japonica in cultivation
