= Padbruggea =

Scientific classification
- Kingdom: Plantae
- Clade: Tracheophytes
- Clade: Angiosperms
- Clade: Eudicots
- Clade: Rosids
- Order: Fabales
- Family: Fabaceae
- Subfamily: Faboideae
- Tribe: Wisterieae
- Genus: Padbruggea; Miq. (1855)

Species
- See text.

Genus of legumes

Padbruggea is a genus of flowering plants in the family Fabaceae. Its native range stretches from southern China to western Malesia.

== Description ==
Padbruggea species are scrambling climbers, reaching heights of up to 25 m (82 ft). Their stems are dark green becoming brown with age. Their leaves are evergreen and generally have 8–18 paired leaflets plus a terminal leaflet. The leaflets are 5–12 cm (2.0–4.7 in) long by 2–3 cm (0.8–1.2 in) wide. The erect inflorescence is a panicle, 7–35 cm (3 in – 1 ft 2 in) long, usually terminal, sometimes leafy and sometimes emerging directly from the stem. The individual flowers are 13–25 mm (0.5–1.0 in) long and have the general shape of members of the subfamily Faboideae. The standard petal is 14–25 mm (0.6–1.0 in) long by 14–22 mm (0.6–0.9 in) wide, with a lilac or pinkish inner surface and a yellow nectar guide. The wing petals are about the same length as the keel at 13–20 mm (0.5–0.8 in) long by 8–11 mm (0.3–0.4 in) wide, and have short basal claws. The keel petals are 10–15 mm (0.4–0.6 in) long by 3–10 mm (0.1–0.4 in) wide with a claw up to 10 mm (0.4 in) long. Nine of the stamens are fused together, the other is free; all curve upwards at the apex. The inflated seed pods are 10–25 cm (3.9–9.8 in) long by 5–11 cm (2.0–4.3 in) wide, splitting when ripe to release their 1–2 seeds.

== Taxonomy ==
The genus Padbruggea was established by Friedrich Miquel in 1855. The genus name is in honour of Robbert Padbrugge (or Padtbrugge) (1638–1703), a Dutch doctor in the service of the Dutch East India Company. He was governor of Ambon from 1682 to 1687. A 2019 molecular phylogenetic study placed the genus in an expanded tribe Wisterieae, in a clade with Austrocallerya and, more distantly, Wisteria. The shape of the seed pods is one feature distinguishing Padbruggea from Austrocallerya. Padbruggea has seed pods that are oblong or obovoid and coarsely ridged; those of Austrocallerya are spindle-shaped and finely ridged or grooved, with constrictions between the seeds (torulose).

=== Species ===
According to Kew:

- Padbruggea dasyphylla Miq.
- Padbruggea filipes (Dunn) Craib
- Padbruggea maingayi (Baker) Dunn

== Distribution ==
Padbruggea species are native from south-central and southeast mainland China, through Indo-China (Laos, Malaya, Myanmar, Thailand and Vietnam) to Sumatra and Java.
