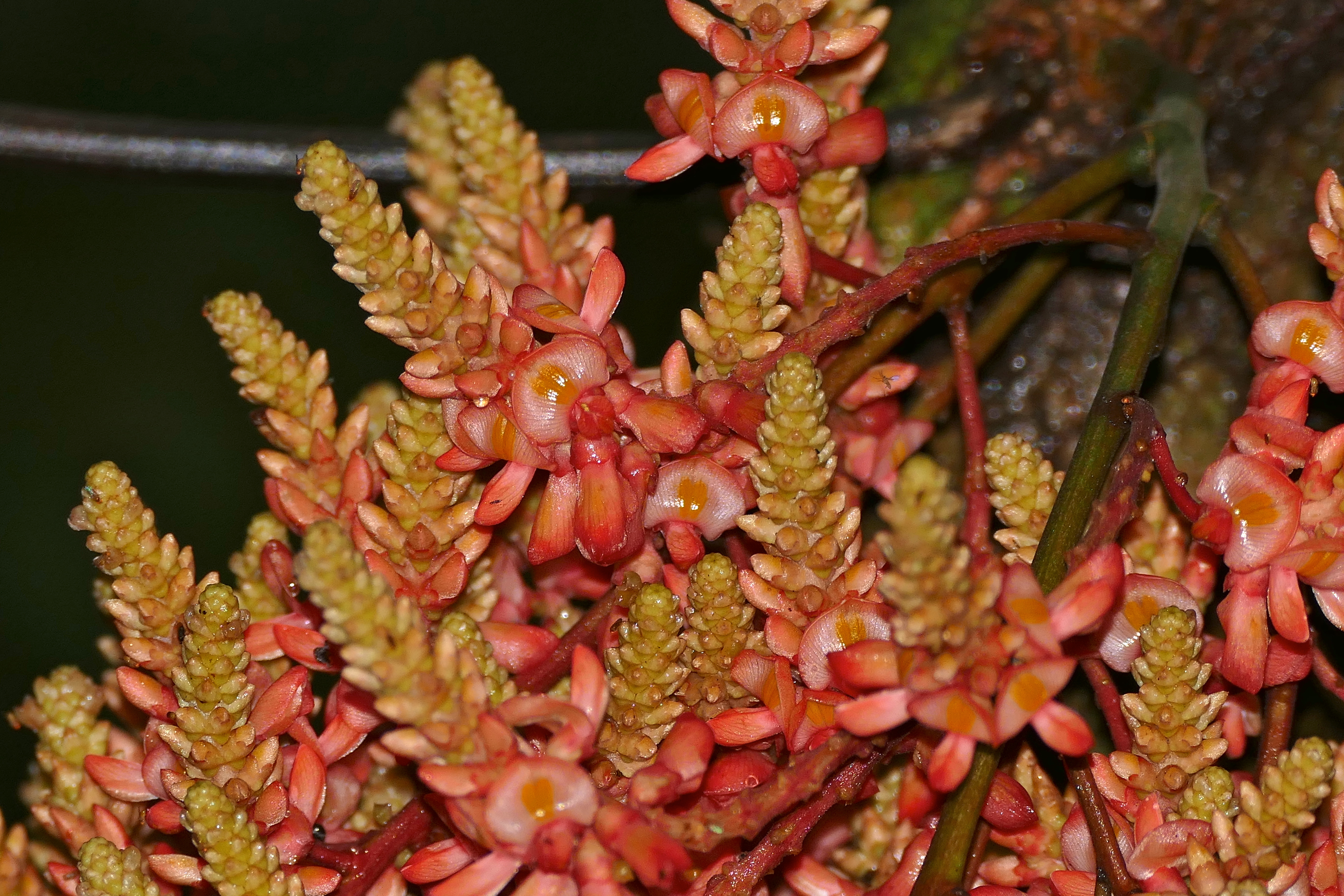
- Whitfordiodendron nieuwenhuisii (synonym Callerya nieuwenhuisii)

Scientific classification
- Kingdom: Plantae
- Clade: Tracheophytes
- Clade: Angiosperms
- Clade: Eudicots
- Clade: Rosids
- Order: Fabales
- Family: Fabaceae
- Subfamily: Faboideae
- Tribe: Wisterieae
- Genus: Whitfordiodendron; Elmer

Type species
- Whitfordiodendron scandens (Benth.) Geesink.

Diversity
- 4 species

Synonyms
- Whitfordia Elmer

= Whitfordiodendron =

Genus of legumes

Whitfordiodendron is a genus of flowering plants in the legume family, of Fabaceae. It belongs to the subfamily Faboideae.

Its native range is from Thailand to western and central Malesia (including Borneo, Malaya, the Philippines and Sumatra).

== Description ==
Species of Whitfordiodendron are scrambling climbers, typically 10–20 m (33–66 ft) tall or even more. The leaves have 2 to 12 leaflets arranged in pairs plus a terminal leaflet. The leaflets are large, generally 4–15 cm (1.6–5.9 in) long or even up to 25 cm (9.8 in) long by 2–9 cm (0.8–3.5 in) or more wide. The inflorescence is a panicle 5–20 cm (2.0–7.9 in) long. In W. nieuwenhuisii, the panicles emerge directly from the main trunk; in the other species they are terminal on the branches. Individual flowers have the typical shape of members of the subfamily Faboideae and are 8–23 mm (0.3–0.9 in) long. The standard petal is 8–18 mm (0.3–0.7 in) long by 9–16 mm (0.4–0.6 in) wide with its inner surface greyish pink or white with flushes of various shades of red. It has a yellow or green nectar guide. The wing petals are 8–18 mm (0.3–0.7 in) long by 2–5 mm (0.1–0.2 in) wide, more or less equal in length to the keel. The keel petals have a short claw. Nine of the stamens are fused together, the other is free; all curve upwards at the apex. The inflated seed pods are 4–10 cm (1.6–3.9 in) long by 2–5 cm (0.8–2.0 in) wide, splitting when ripe to release the 1–3 seeds.

== Taxonomy ==
The genus Whitfordiodendron was established by Adolph Elmer in 1910. The genus name is in honour of Harry Nichols Whitford (1872–1941), an American forester and professor of tropical forestry at Yale University. The Latin suffix of dendron means tree.

It has been treated as a synonym of Callerya; for example, as of January 2023 the genus was not recognized by the United States Department of Agriculture and the Agricultural Research Service. A molecular phylogenetic study in 2019 reaffirmed its status as a separate genus, and the genus was accepted by Plants of the World Online.

=== Species ===
It has four accepted species:

- Whitfordiodendron erianthum (Benth.) Dunn
- Whitfordiodendron nieuwenhuisii (J.J.Sm.) Dunn
- Whitfordiodendron scandens (Elmer) Elmer
- Whitfordiodendron sumatranum Merr.
