= Pongamia =

Scientific classification
- Kingdom: Plantae
- Clade: Tracheophytes
- Clade: Angiosperms
- Clade: Eudicots
- Clade: Rosids
- Order: Fabales
- Family: Fabaceae
- Subfamily: Faboideae
- Tribe: Millettieae
- Genus: Pongamia; Adans.

Synonyms
- Cajum Kuntze; Fordia Hemsl.; Ibatiria W.E.Cooper

Genus of flowering plants

Pongamia is a genus of plant in the family Fabaceae. The genus, formerly treated as monotypic, was extended to include 54 species in 2025, following research that showed the genus Millettia was paraphyletic. This expanded genus also includes the former genera Fordia and Ibatiria.

== Species ==
The following 54 species are recognised by Plants of the World Online:

- Pongamia ademae Z.Q.Song
- Pongamia ahernii (Merr. & Rolfe) Z.Q.Song
- Pongamia borneensis (Adema) Z.Q.Song
- Pongamia brachybotrys (Merr.) Z.Q.Song
- Pongamia brachycarpa (Merr.) Z.Q.Song
- Pongamia brandisiana (Kurz) Z.Q.Song
- Pongamia calcicola (Mattapha, G.P.Lewis & Hawkins) Z.Q.Song
- Pongamia cana (Benth. ex Baker) Z.Q.Song
- Pongamia caudata (Benth.) Z.Q.Song
- Pongamia cauliflora (Hemsl.) Z.Q.Song
- Pongamia chrysamaryssa (Adema) Z.Q.Song
- Pongamia craibii Z.Q.Song
- Pongamia cubittii (Dunn) Z.Q.Song
- Pongamia densiflora (Mattapha, Lanors. & Lamxay) Z.Q.Song
- Pongamia diptera (Gagnep.) Z.Q.Song
- Pongamia erythrocalyx (Gagnep.) Z.Q.Song
- Pongamia furfuracea (W.E.Cooper) Z.Q.Song
- Pongamia glaucescens (Kurz) Z.Q.Song
- Pongamia griffithii (Dunn) Z.Q.Song
- Pongamia harmandii (Gagnep.) Z.Q.Song
- Pongamia kangensis (Craib) Z.Q.Song
- Pongamia lanceolata (Ridl.) Z.Q.Song
- Pongamia longipes (Perkins) Z.Q.Song
- Pongamia macrostachya (Collett & Hemsl.) Z.Q.Song
- Pongamia merrillii (Perkins) Z.Q.Song
- Pongamia multiflora (Collett & Hemsl.) Z.Q.Song
- Pongamia nepalensis (R.Parker) Z.Q.Song
- Pongamia nigrescens (Gagnep.) Z.Q.Song
- Pongamia ophirensis (Ridl.) Z.Q.Song
- Pongamia oraria (Hance) Z.Q.Song
- Pongamia pauciflora (Dunn) Z.Q.Song
- Pongamia peguensis (Ali) Z.Q.Song
- Pongamia penicillata (Gagnep.) Z.Q.Song
- Pongamia phuwuaensis (Mattapha & Suddee) Z.Q.Song
- Pongamia pinnata (L.) Pierre
- Pongamia platyphylla (Merr. ex Dunn) Z.Q.Song
- Pongamia principis (Gagnep.) Z.Q.Song
- Pongamia pterocarpa (Dunn) Z.Q.Song
- Pongamia puerarioides (Prain) Z.Q.Song
- Pongamia pulchra (Voigt) Z.Q.Song
- Pongamia pyrrhocarpa (Mattapha, F.Forest & Hawkins) Z.Q.Song
- Pongamia rheophytica (Buijsen) Z.Q.Song
- Pongamia sirindhorniana (Mattapha, Thananth., Kaewmuan & Suddee) Z.Q.Song
- Pongamia solomonensis (Verdc.) Z.Q.Song
- Pongamia splendidissima (Blume ex Miq.) Z.Q.Song
- Pongamia stipularis (Prain) Z.Q.Song
- Pongamia stipulata (Dunn) Z.Q.Song
- Pongamia suddeei (Mattapha & Tetsana) Z.Q.Song
- Pongamia tecta (Craib) Z.Q.Song
- Pongamia tenuipes (Merr.) Z.Q.Song
- Pongamia tetraptera (Kurz) Z.Q.Song
- Pongamia tomentosa (Mattapha & Tetsana) Z.Q.Song
- Pongamia xylocarpa (Miq.) Z.Q.Song
- Pongamia yunnanensis (Pamp.) Z.Q.Song
