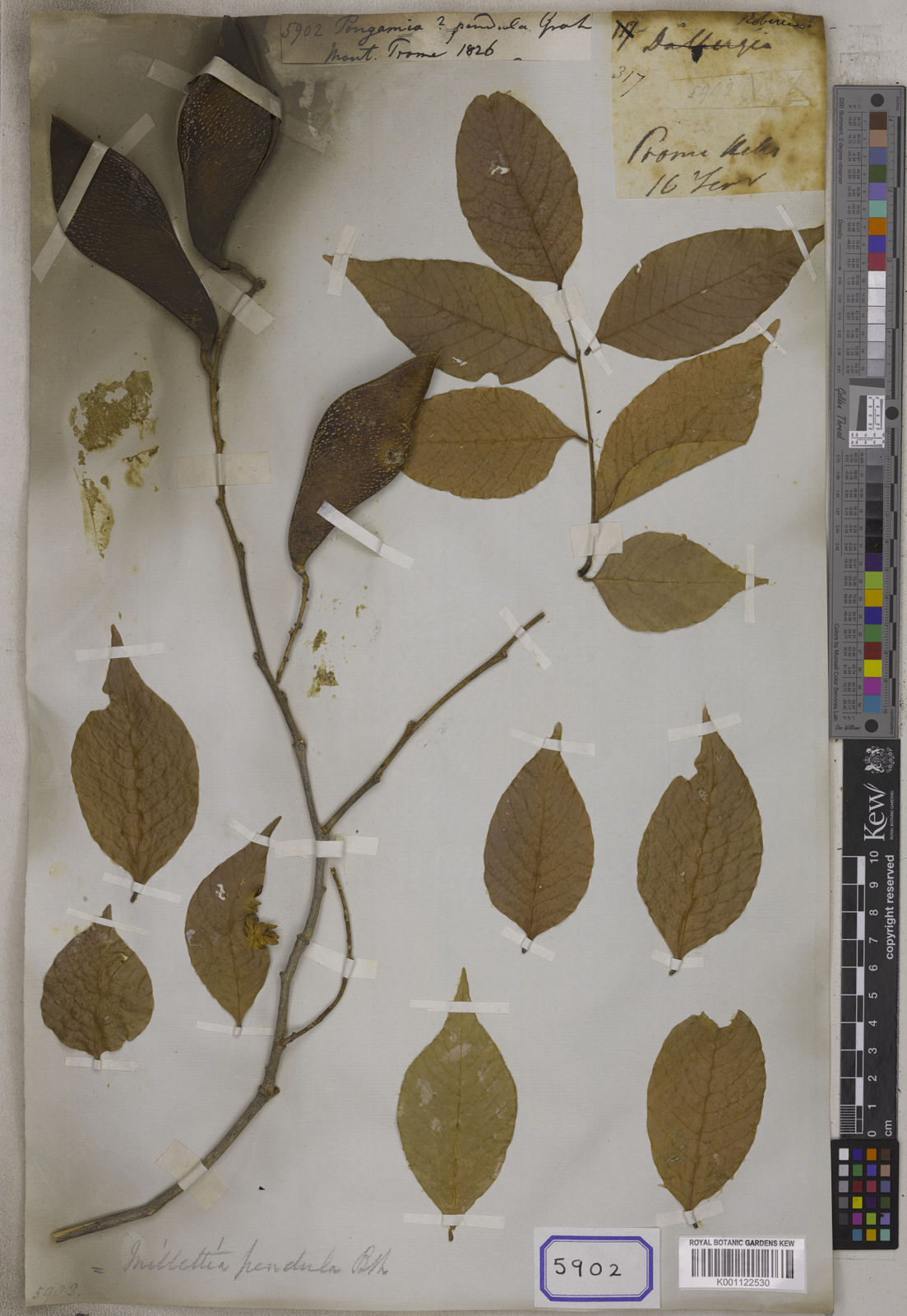
- Imbralyx leucanthus var. leucanthus

Scientific classification
- Kingdom: Plantae
- Clade: Tracheophytes
- Clade: Angiosperms
- Clade: Eudicots
- Clade: Rosids
- Order: Fabales
- Family: Fabaceae
- Subfamily: Faboideae
- Tribe: Millettieae
- Genus: Imbralyx; R.Geesink (1984)

Species
- See text.

= Imbralyx =

Genus of plants

Imbralyx is a genus of flowering plant in the family Fabaceae, native from Bangladesh and south-central China to Sumatra. The genus was established by Robert Geesink in 1984.

== Species ==
As of September 2023, Plants of the World Online accepted the following species:

- Imbralyx acutiflorus (Gagnep.) Z.Q.Song
- Imbralyx albiflorus (Prain) R.Geesink
- Imbralyx bracteolatus (Dasuki & Schot) Z.Q.Song
- Imbralyx incredibilis (Whitmore) Z.Q.Song
- Imbralyx leptobotrys (Dunn) Z.Q.Song
- Imbralyx leucanthus (Kurz) Z.Q.Song
- Imbralyx ngii (Whitmore) Z.Q.Song
- Imbralyx niveus (Dunn) Z.Q.Song
- Imbralyx pierrei (Gagnep.) Z.Q.Song
- Imbralyx unifoliatus (Prain) Z.Q.Song
