= Platycyamus =

Platycyamus may refer to:

- Platycyamus (plant), a genus of plants in the family Fabaceae
- Platycyamus (amphipod), a genus of whale lice in the family Cyamidae
