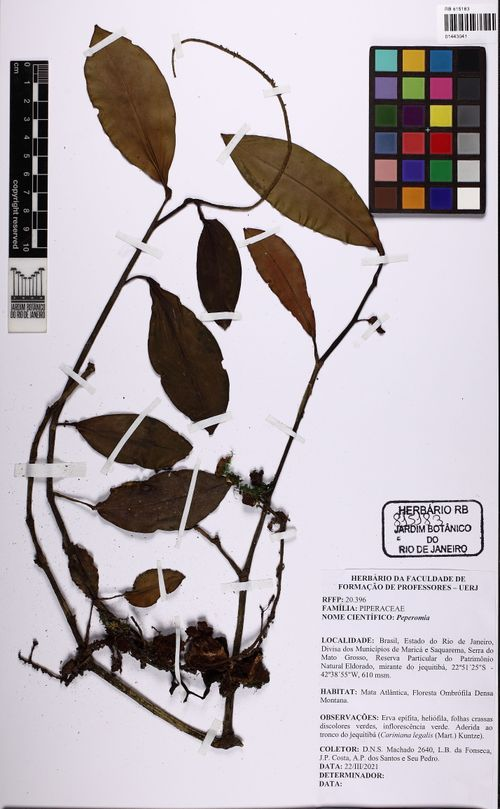

Scientific classification
- Kingdom: Plantae
- Clade: Embryophytes
- Clade: Tracheophytes
- Clade: Angiosperms
- Clade: Magnoliids
- Order: Piperales
- Family: Piperaceae
- Genus: Peperomia
- Species: P. turbinata

Binomial name
- Peperomia turbinata Dahlst.

= Peperomia turbinata =

Species of flowering plant

Peperomia turbinata is a species of flowering plant from the genus Peperomia. It was first described by Gustav Adolf Hugo Dahlstedt and published in the book "Kongliga Svenska Vetenskaps Academiens Handlingar 33(2): 88. 1900". The species name came from the Latin word "turbinatus", which means cone-headed.

== Distribution ==
It is endemic to Brazil. First specimens where found in São Paulo.

- Brazil
  - Bahia
  - São Paulo
  - Atlantic Forest
  - Espirito Santo
    - Cariacica
    - Águia Branca
    - Santa Maria de Jetibá
  - Rio de Janeiro
  - Minas Gerais

== Description ==
The entire plant is sturdy, glossy, and smooth. It is long, creeping, rooted at the nodes, smooth, succulent, subwoody at the base, and pale green. Its 5–10 mm in diameter, thick branches that can reach up to 0.5 m in length large leaves with subterete petioles. It is dark green below and pale green above, with 2-4 shorter lobes arranged, obovate-elliptic vs. elliptic-lanceolate, junior lanceolate. It is base generally canaliculate, attenuated - acute, apex abruptly and quickly that occasionally distantly pointed, fleshy-coriaceous. It is 5-7 nerved with has basal ribs that are frequently yellow-green, somewhat recurved, subrectal v. patent, and nearly placed in a couplet. The rib is robust, submerged above and very conspicuous below, with indistinct nerves. The rib is branched above the basal ribs, much like penninervia. Leaf blades are terminal, solitary, very slender, and somewhat overhanging. The peduncle of the stem is concolorous that are slightly reddish and supported by three to four shorter leaves, while the citrus leaves are derived from one to two deciduous leaves. Extremely dense berries that are open when ripe and turn to the base. They are narrowly and obliquely turbinate versus obconoeae, curved, laterally compressed, with an oblique apex, concave, elliptic-lanceolate, and rolled edges. The berries are arranged above the stigmatiferous middle.

It is a unique species distinguished from all others in this section by its sturdy growth, unique leaf morphology, and, most importantly, its oddly formed fruits. The stem is prostrate at the base. It expands to a diameter of only 5 to 10 mm at the top, and shoots off prostrate, non-branched stolons that can reach lengths of up to 0.5 metres. The leaves are 10–15 cm long, 5–8 cm wide, with the largest width across the middle. The petioles grow to a length of 5 cm and beyond, and they become 4 mm wide. The ear stalks measure 3 mm thick and 3–3.5 cm long. The ears measure 22 centimetres in length and thickness, and are often the same colour as the stalk or occasionally reddish.
