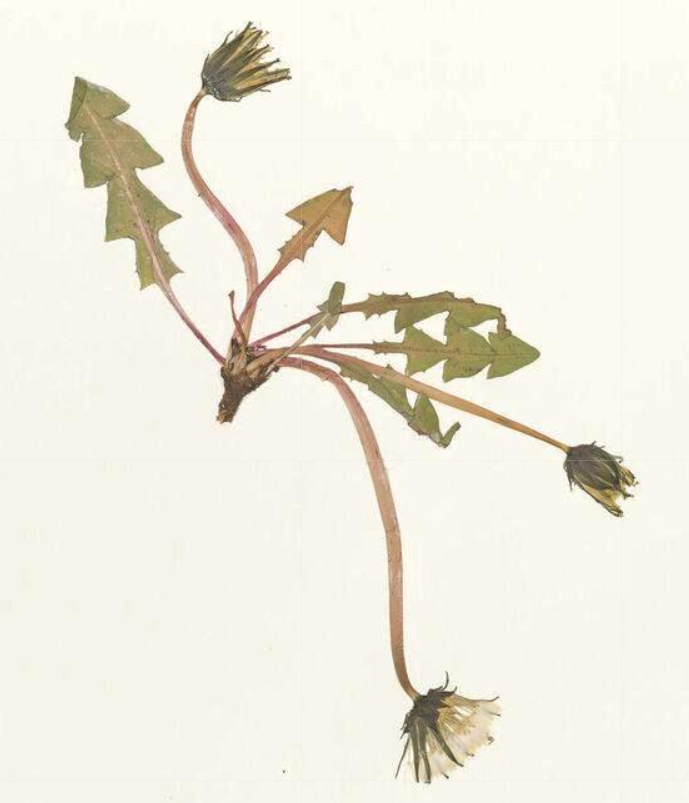

Scientific classification
- Kingdom: Plantae
- Clade: Tracheophytes
- Clade: Angiosperms
- Clade: Eudicots
- Clade: Asterids
- Order: Asterales
- Family: Asteraceae
- Genus: Taraxacum
- Species: T. britannicum

Binomial name
- Taraxacum britannicum Dahlst.
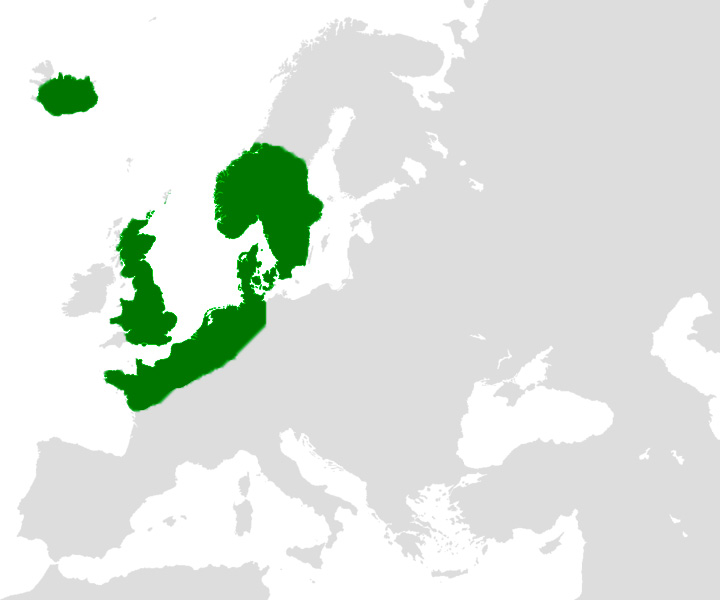
- Taraxacum britannicum range

= Taraxacum britannicum =

Species of flowering plant

Taraxacum britannicum, commonly known as the British dandelion, is a perennial agamospermous species of dandelion in the family Asteraceae. It is native to northwestern and western Europe, with a primary distribution in the British Isles, where it occurs in a variety of habitats including wet meadows, cliffs, ravines, pavements, and other disturbed or man-made environments. The species is also reported from several other European countries, particularly in Western Europe and Fennoscandia.

T. britannicum is morphologically variable, especially in leaf shape, and has often been considered a leaf-form variant of Taraxacum adamii. Despite historical recognition as a separate species, the two are now widely treated as conspecific, with shared floral and fruit characteristics and a tendency to co-occur with intermediate forms. The taxon was first formally described by Swedish botanist Gustaf Dahlstedt in 1927 in the Report of the Botanical Society and Exchange Club of the British Isles.

== Description ==
Taraxacum britannicum is a morphologically variable species, particularly in its leaf shape. The leaves measure between 50–200 mm (2.0–7.9 in) in length, are smooth, dull green to bluish, and unspotted. They typically have 3 to 5 triangular lobes that are patent or somewhat recurved, with distal margins that are straight-sided or convex and nearly entire. The petiole is usually purple and commonly winged. The flowering scapes are 70–200 mm (2.8–7.9 in) tall and erect. The outer bracts measure approximately 7 mm (0.28 in) by 2 mm (0.079 in), are erect, very dark green, and feature an indistinct white margin. The capitulum is around 40 mm (1.6 in) in diameter and deep yellow in color, with relatively long ligules that bear grey-violet striping. Styles are exserted and discolored; pollen may be present or absent. The achenes are brownish, approximately 3.2 mm (0.13 in) long, spinulose in the upper region, and topped with a cone about 0.5 mm (0.020 in) in length. The species is an obligate agamosperm with a chromosome count of 2n = 24.

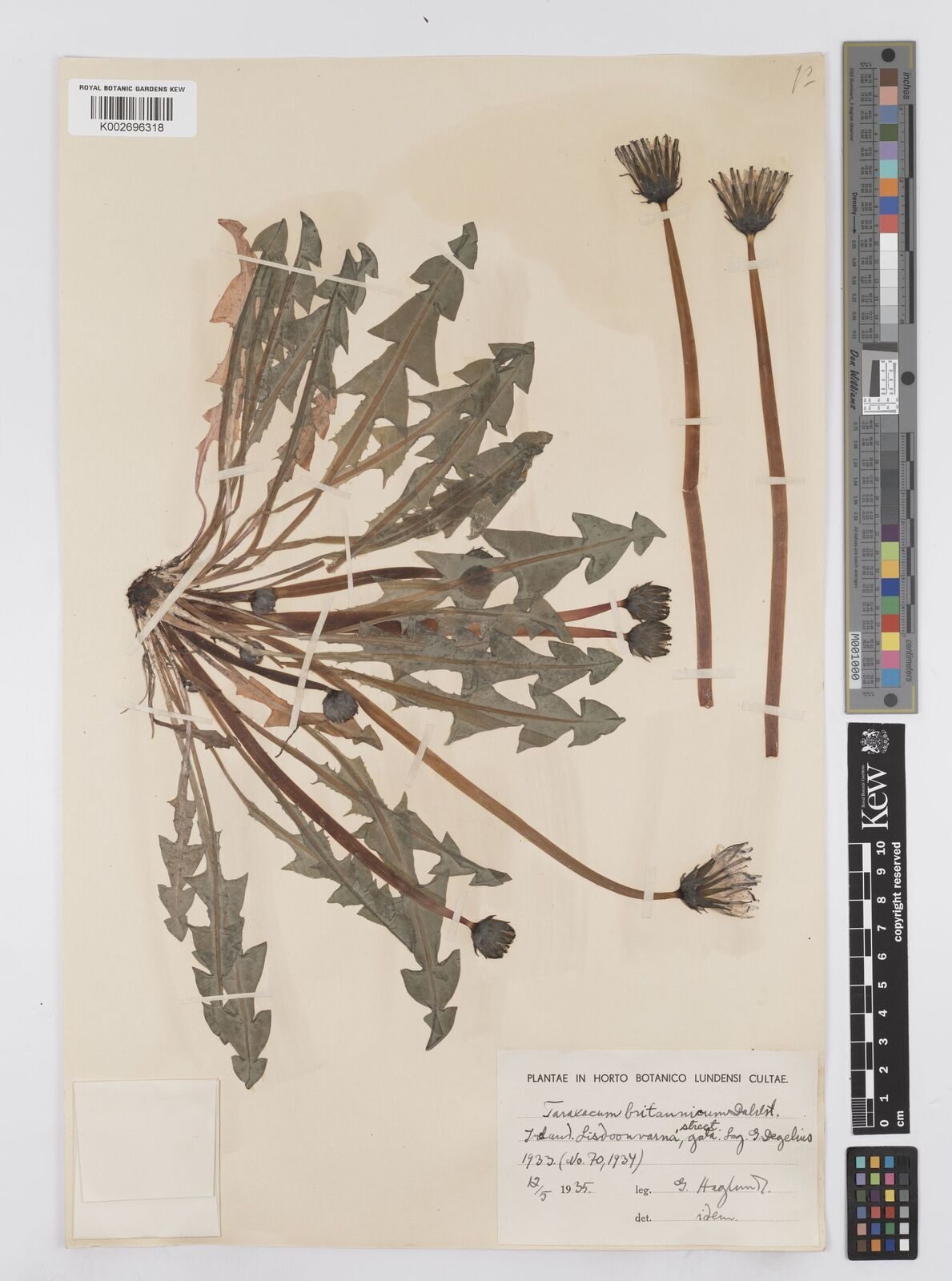
Specimen collected in Iceland

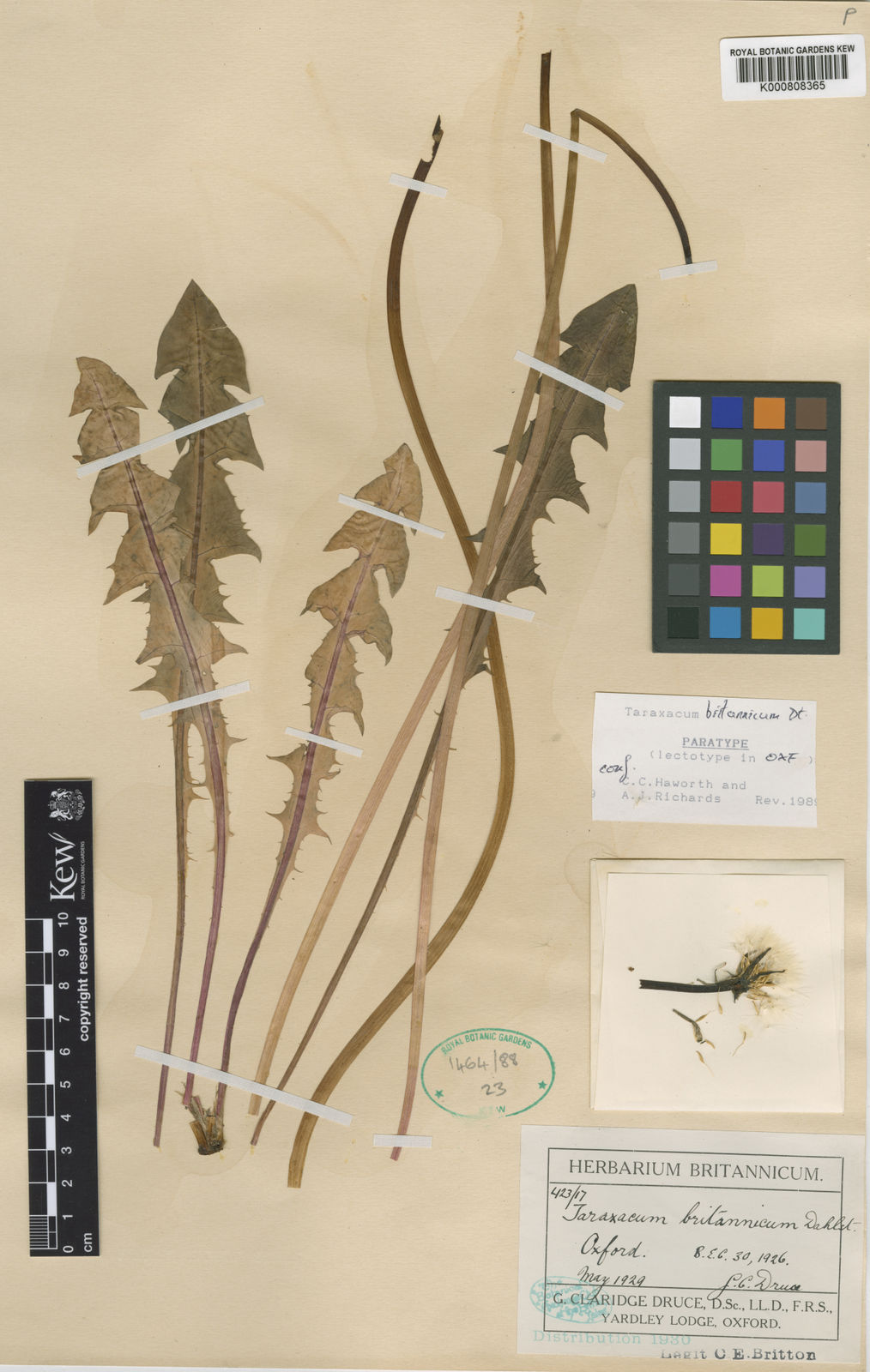
Leaves and flower specimen

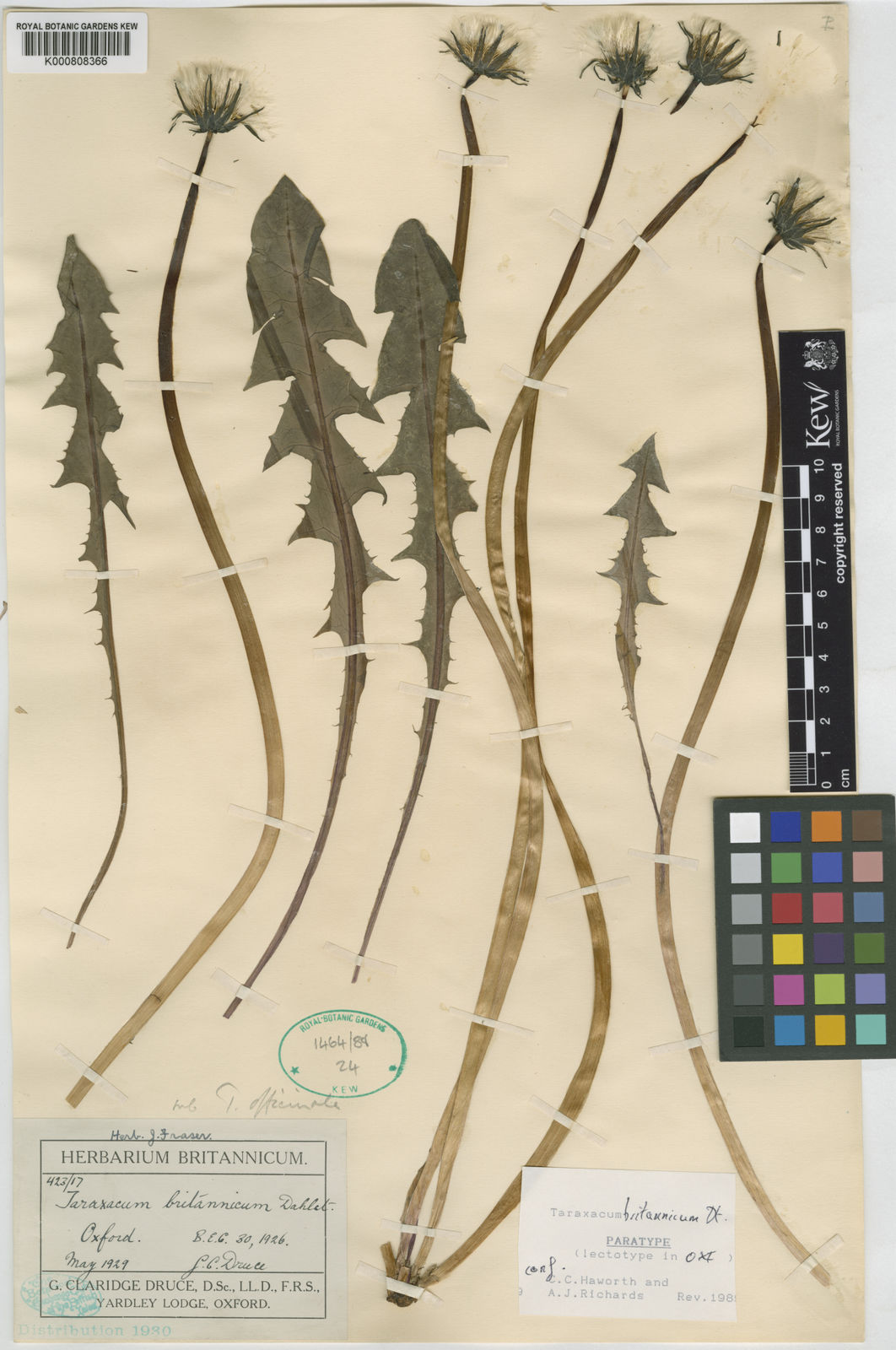
Seedhead specimens

== Taxonomy ==
Taraxacum britannicum was first formally described by Swedish botanist Gustaf Dahlstedt in 1927 in the Report of the Botanical Society and Exchange Club of the British Isles. The name has also appeared in earlier and later taxonomic contexts under various synonyms, including Taraxacum adamii (1891), Taraxacum gelertii (1903), and several unpublished herbarium names such as T. hibernicola, T. kewense, and T. subbritannicum. However, T. britannicum differs from T. gelertii in possessing smooth achenes (rugose and with large spines in the latter).

T. britannicum was sometimes considered a morphotype or leaf-form variant of Taraxacum adamii. The two taxa have been described as indistinguishable in floral and fruit morphology, differing primarily in leaf shape. Studies and cultivation experiments have demonstrated that forms of T. britannicum can transition into the typical leaf form of T. adamii, and both types frequently occur intermixed in the wild, with numerous morphological intermediates. As a result, some taxonomists regard T. britannicum as conspecific with T. adamii, placing it within the Taraxacum section Vulgaria.

However, both in the monograph of British dandelions and in the Flora of Great Britain and Ireland, Taraxacum britannicum as considered as a separate species, either in the section Celtica or in the section Naevosa.

== Distribution and habitat ==
Taraxacum britannicum is native to the British Isles, where it is widespread throughout Britain, although becoming less frequent in the north. It inhabits a range of environments, including wet meadows, man-made habitats such as pavements, walls, and gardens, as well as natural sites like cliffs and ravines, particularly in western and northern regions. Beyond the British Isles, the species is known from Western Europe and Fennoscandia, with confirmed occurrences in countries including Belgium, Denmark, France, Germany, the Netherlands, Norway, Sweden, and Iceland.

== Conservation ==
According to a 2024 global assessment of extinction risks in flowering plants, Taraxacum britannicum is not currently predicted to be threatened with extinction. However, this classification was made with low confidence, indicating that further research may be necessary to confirm its conservation status.
