= Peperomia verruculosa =

Scientific classification
- Kingdom: Plantae
- Clade: Tracheophytes
- Clade: Angiosperms
- Clade: Magnoliids
- Order: Piperales
- Family: Piperaceae
- Genus: Peperomia
- Species: P. verruculosa

Binomial name
- Peperomia verruculosa Dahlst. ex A.W.Hill

Species of plant

Peperomia verruculosa is a species of plant from the genus Peperomia. It was discovered by Gustav Dahlstedt and Arthur William Hill published the species in the book "Annals of Botany. Oxford 20(80): 406, t. 29. 1906". Verruculosa came from the word "verruculose". Verruculose is having moderate-sized growths.

== Distribution ==
Peperomia verruculusa is endemic to Peru.

- Peru
  - Junín
    - Huancayo
  - Cusco
    - Urubamba
    - Canchis
  - Huancavelica
  - Ancash
    - Huaylas
  - Puño

== Description ==
The fruit is about 1.4 millimeters long and 1.1 millimeters wide and contains a seed measuring about 7 millimeters long and .55 millimeters wide. The pittings in the pericarp wall are much deep than in P. parvifolia, and has in consequence a much rougher appearance. The section of the pericarp consists of five rows of cells; the innermost layer, bounding the testa of the seed, formed fairly large, clear, and tangentially elongated cells, and surrounding these two lays of small, more or less isodiametric cells. Two outermost layers form the outer wall of the fruit, the external is composed of long radially elongated and often curved cells with thick walls, which are arranged in groups.
