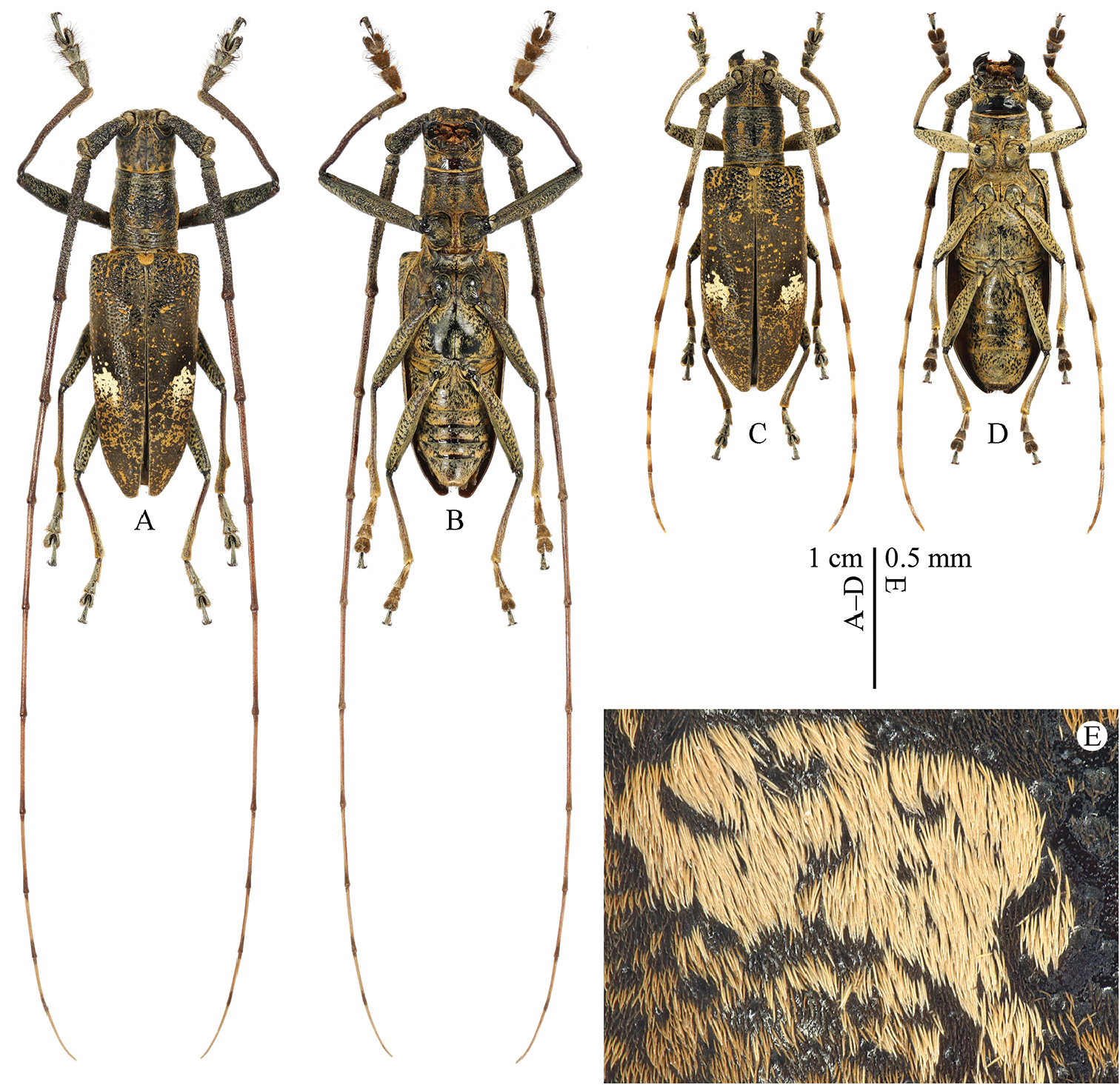

Scientific classification
- Domain: Eukaryota
- Kingdom: Animalia
- Phylum: Arthropoda
- Class: Insecta
- Order: Coleoptera
- Suborder: Polyphaga
- Infraorder: Cucujiformia
- Family: Cerambycidae
- Tribe: Lamiini
- Genus: Pseudomacrochenus
- Species: P. wusuae

Binomial name
- Pseudomacrochenus wusuae He, Liu & Wang, 2017

= Pseudomacrochenus wusuae =

Species of beetle

Pseudomacrochenus wusuae is a species of beetle in the family Cerambycidae. They are found in Sichuan, China.

== Life cycle ==
As larvae, Pseudomacrochenus wusuae spend their time living in dead wood. Little is known of their early life, but they are known to spend around 28 days in their last instar before pupating. They will stay as a pupa for another roughly 31 days before emerging as an adult. Their only known host plant is Craspedolobium unijugum.
