= Peperomia acuminata =

Scientific classification
- Kingdom: Plantae
- Clade: Tracheophytes
- Clade: Angiosperms
- Clade: Magnoliids
- Order: Piperales
- Family: Piperaceae
- Genus: Peperomia
- Species: P. acuminata

Binomial name
- Peperomia acuminata Ruiz & Pav.

Synonyms
- List: Peperomia acuminata f. rubra Steyerm.; Peperomia acuminatifolia Trel.; Peperomia basellifolia Kunth; Peperomia cacuminicola Trel.; Peperomia dendrophila Griseb.; Peperomia dichroophylla Sodiro; Peperomia ekmanii Trel.; Peperomia huacachiana Trel.; Peperomia larecajana C.DC.; Peperomia larecajana var. angustifolia Yunck.; Peperomia nemorosa (Vahl) C.DC.; Peperomia nemorosa Dahlst.; Peperomia ruiziana C.DC.; Piper acuminatum (Ruiz & Pav.) Pers.; Piper basellifolium (Kunth) Poir.; Piper monostachyos Poir.; Piper murinum Roem. & Schult.; Piper nemorosum Vahl; Piper obliquum Pers.; Piper planifolium Poir.

Species of plant

Peperomia acuminata, is a species of flowering plant in the family Piperaceae. Its native range reaches from central South America to Central America and the West Indies.

== Uses ==
Peperomia acuminata is used in folk medicine as well in foods.
