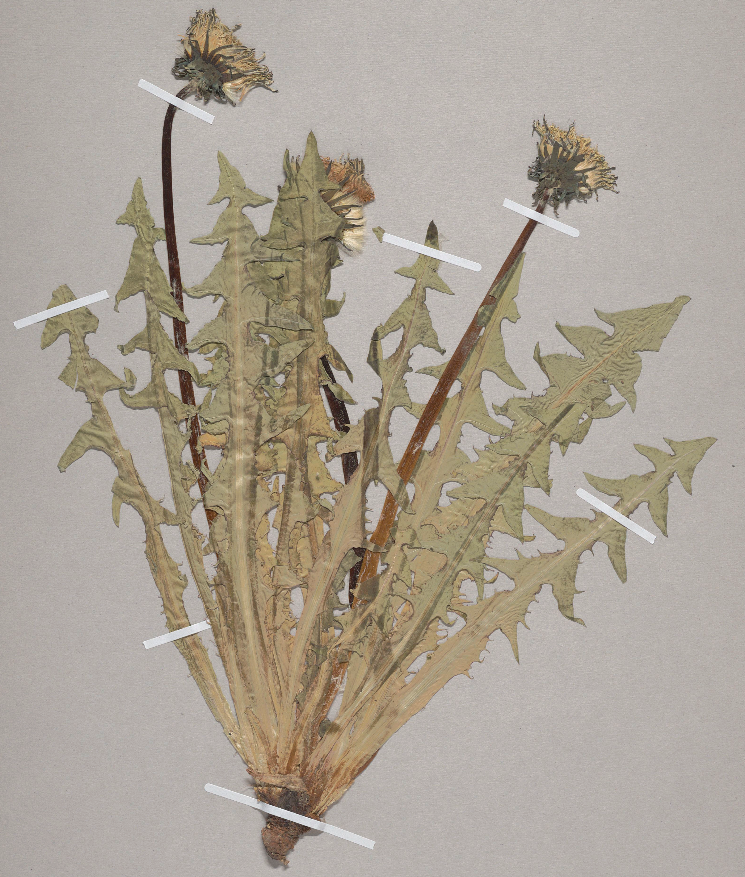

Scientific classification
- Kingdom: Plantae
- Clade: Tracheophytes
- Clade: Angiosperms
- Clade: Eudicots
- Clade: Asterids
- Order: Asterales
- Family: Asteraceae
- Genus: Taraxacum
- Species: T. privum

Binomial name
- Taraxacum privum Dahlst.
- Taraxacum privum native range

= Taraxacum privum =

Species of flowering plant

Taraxacum privum, commonly known as the green-collared roadside dandelion in Denmark and the herring dandelion in Sweden, is a perennial species of dandelion native to northern and central Europe. It occurs primarily in temperate biomes, where it inhabits grassy places and roadsides. The species was first described in 1911 by Swedish botanist Gustaf Dahlstedt in Arkiv för Botanik and is accepted as a distinct species within the genus Taraxacum. Its native range includes the Baltic States, Fennoscandia, the British Isles, the Low Countries, and parts of central and eastern Europe. It has also been introduced into the Free State province of South Africa. Although morphologically similar to several related species, T. privum is distinguished by its long and broad outer bracts, yellow styles, and plump, straw-colored achenes.

== Description ==
Taraxacum privum is a perennial herbaceous species recognized by its tall scapes and distinct foliar morphology. The leaves are pale to mid-green, occasionally displaying darker blotches along the internodes. They are held erect and range from 100 to 250 mm in length. Each leaf typically has four to five crowded, recurved lateral lobes that are triangular in shape, with straight margins that are either entire or slightly toothed. The terminal lobe is also triangular in outline. The petioles are broadly winged and commonly exhibit a rose-pink hue, although pigmentation may be faint or absent in some individuals.

The outer leaves are narrowly lanceolate, with broad, deltoid lobes that taper sharply at the base. These lobes are generally recurved, and the mid-lobe is relatively narrow and notched near its middle. Inner leaves are more variable, with lobes often directed downward and the terminal lobe becoming increasingly large and sagittate in shape. Involucral bracts are robust and thick, with outer bracts measuring approximately 15 × 4–5 mm. These are broad, spreading, and pale green above, with a darker, often purplish tinge on the underside. The upper bracts are typically more obtuse, while inner ones are narrower and linear-lanceolate, often lacking subapical calluses.

The flowering scapes are generally longer than the leaves, erect, and measure between 200 and 350 mm in height. The capitulum is moderately radiate and slightly convex, reaching up to 50 mm in diameter. The ligules are pale with grey-purple stripes on the reverse. Styles are bright yellow when fresh, fading to pale straw color upon drying, and pollen is typically present, although some flowers may show reduced or absent pollen production. This variability in pollen content is notable and appears to be influenced by environmental conditions.

Achenes are thick, straw-colored, and about 3.0 to 3.5 mm long, with a pyramidal cone and a beak approximately 8 mm in length. They are usually smooth, though the apex may exhibit minute spinules. The fruiting body is cylindrical and well-developed.

Taraxacum privum is closely related to T. expallidum and T. pallescens, but it is distinguished by its broader, thicker involucral bracts, paler leaf coloration, and its habit of producing coarser, more robust foliage. Unlike some related species, it has markedly broader and less sharply toothed lateral lobes, and its outer bracts are longer and more conspicuously colored. It also differs in its frequent absence of calluses on the involucral bracts and the presence of thick, straw-colored achenes.

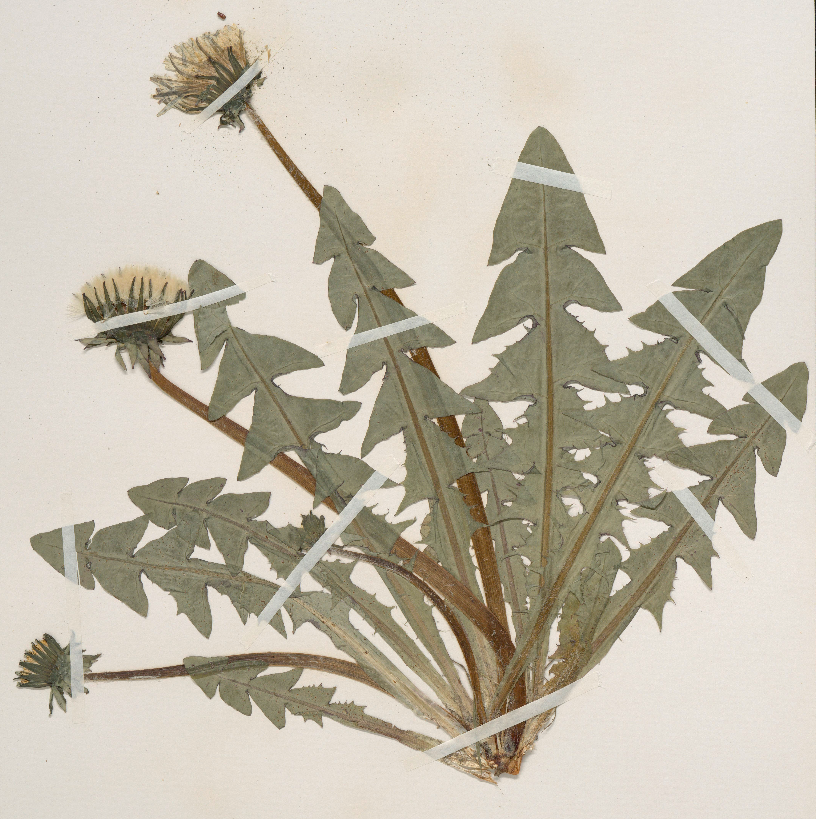
Specimen from Finland

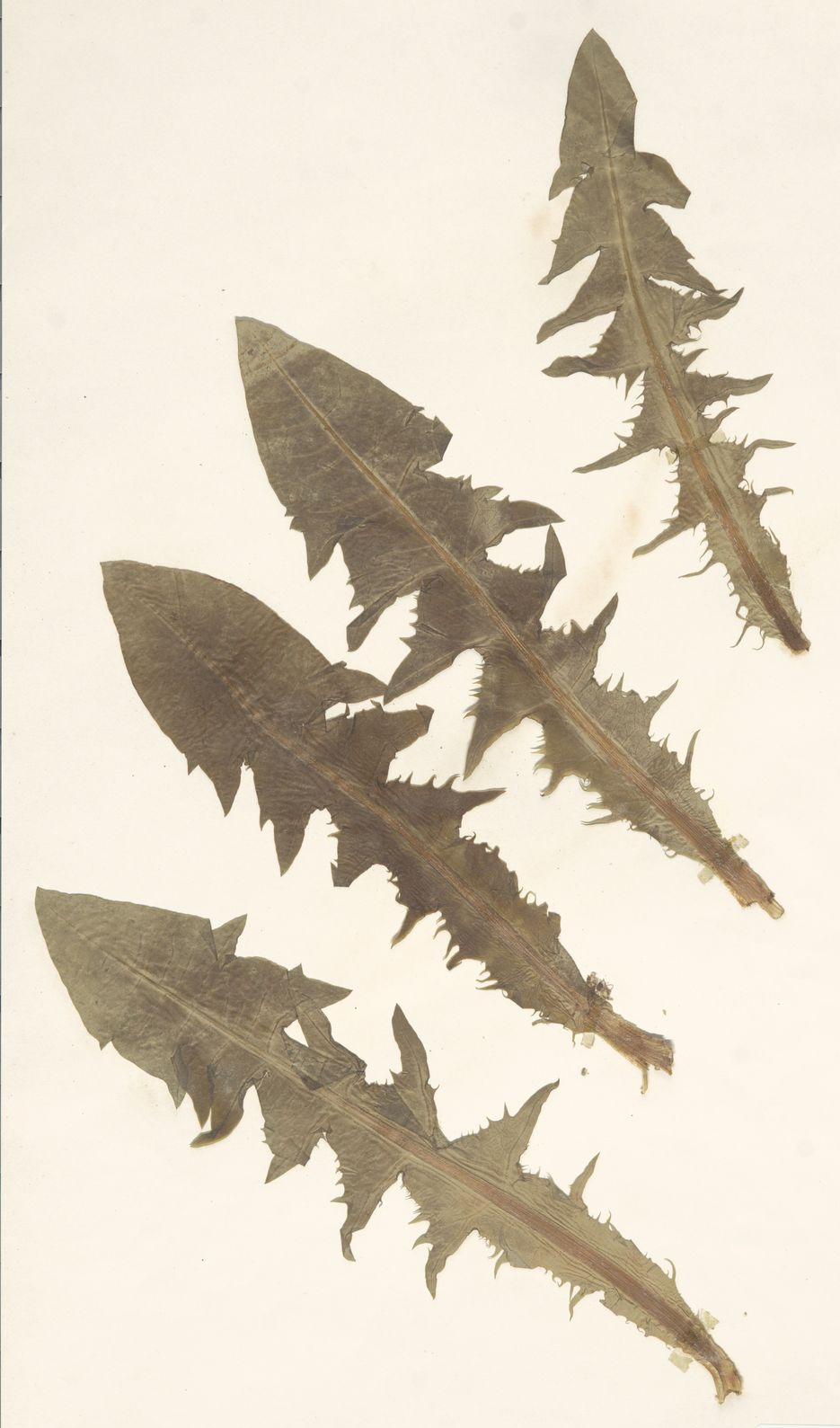
Leaf specimens

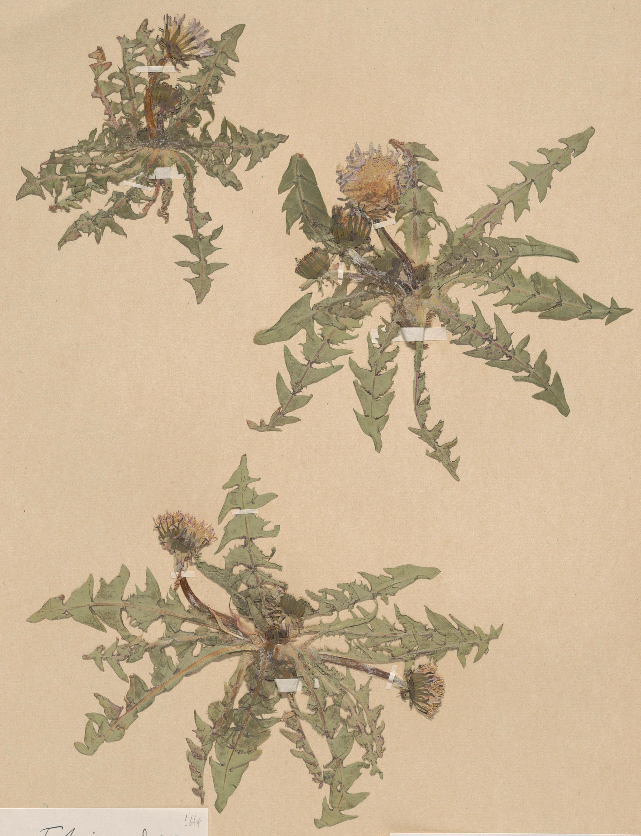
Growth habit specimens

== Taxonomy ==
Taraxacum privum was first formally described by Swedish botanist Gustaf Dahlstedt in 1911, in the journal Arkiv för Botanik, where it appeared under the section Vulgaria as "T. privum n. sp.". It belongs to the genus Taraxacum within the family Asteraceae, a large and diverse group commonly referred to as the daisy or sunflower family. The species is currently accepted and recognized as a distinct taxon within the genus. Dahlstedt classified it among the more morphologically complex dandelions but noted several key traits that set it apart. He observed considerable variability in pollen production, ranging from flowers with no pollen to fully fertile individuals, and suggested this might be influenced by environmental conditions.

Taxonomically, T. privum has been compared to species such as T. expallidum and T. pallescens, which share similar leaf forms. However, it is clearly distinguished by its coarser, paler foliage; broader, deltoid lateral lobes; and particularly thick outer involucral bracts that often lack the subapical calluses found in related species. The styles are bright yellow when fresh, and the achenes are notably thick, plump, and straw-colored, further supporting its separation from close relatives. Dahlstedt emphasized that the species’ combination of pale green to glaucous leaves, large sagittate terminal lobes, and distinctive involucral morphology offered a reliable basis for taxonomic recognition.

== Distribution and habitat ==
Taraxacum privum is native to various regions of northern and central Europe. Its native range includes the Baltic States, Belgium, Denmark, Finland, Germany, the Netherlands, northwestern European Russia, Norway, Poland, and Sweden. Within the British Isles, it is recorded from scattered localities in England and Wales, including several vice-counties, where it is considered very local but probably native. The species has also been introduced into the Free State province of South Africa.

It grows primarily in temperate biomes and is typically found in disturbed grassy habitats. It occurs along roadsides and in other grassy places, often in areas with open, well-lit conditions. Though its distribution is patchy, it is adapted to anthropogenic and semi-natural environments, where competition from taller vegetation is limited. According to Dahlstedt, T. privum was found in exposed grassy locations, often on moderately moist soils, and appeared to favor sunlit, low-competition settings such as road verges and meadow edges. He noted that its occurrence was often local but consistent in such habitats, and that it tolerated light human disturbance, which may have contributed to its scattered but persistent distribution across its range.
