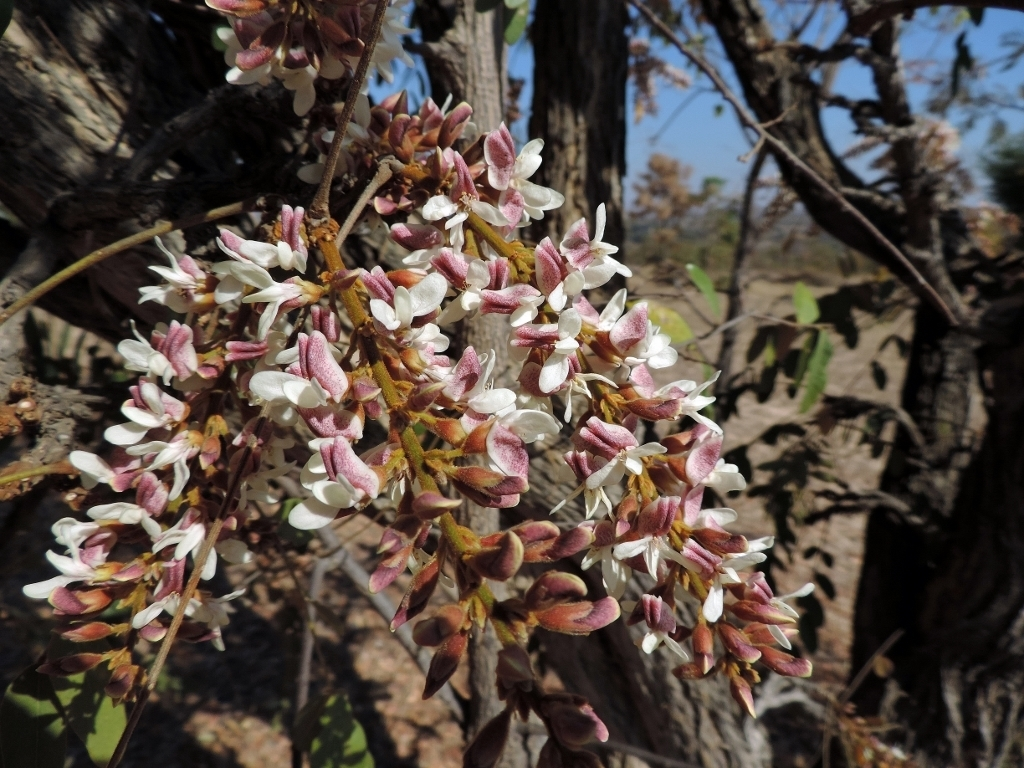

Scientific classification
- Kingdom: Plantae
- Clade: Tracheophytes
- Clade: Angiosperms
- Clade: Eudicots
- Clade: Rosids
- Order: Fabales
- Family: Fabaceae
- Subfamily: Faboideae
- Tribe: Millettieae
- Genus: Dalbergiella; Baker f. (1928)

Species
- Dalbergiella gossweileri Baker f.; Dalbergiella nyasae Baker f.; Dalbergiella welwitschii (Baker) Baker f.

= Dalbergiella =

Genus of legumes

Dalbergiella is a genus of flowering plants in the family Fabaceae. It belongs to subfamily Faboideae. It includes three species native to sub-Saharan Africa, ranging from Guinea to Tanzania, Mozambique, and Angola.

- Dalbergiella gossweileri Baker f.
- Dalbergiella nyasae Baker f.
- Dalbergiella welwitschii (Baker) Baker f., also known as west African blackwood.
