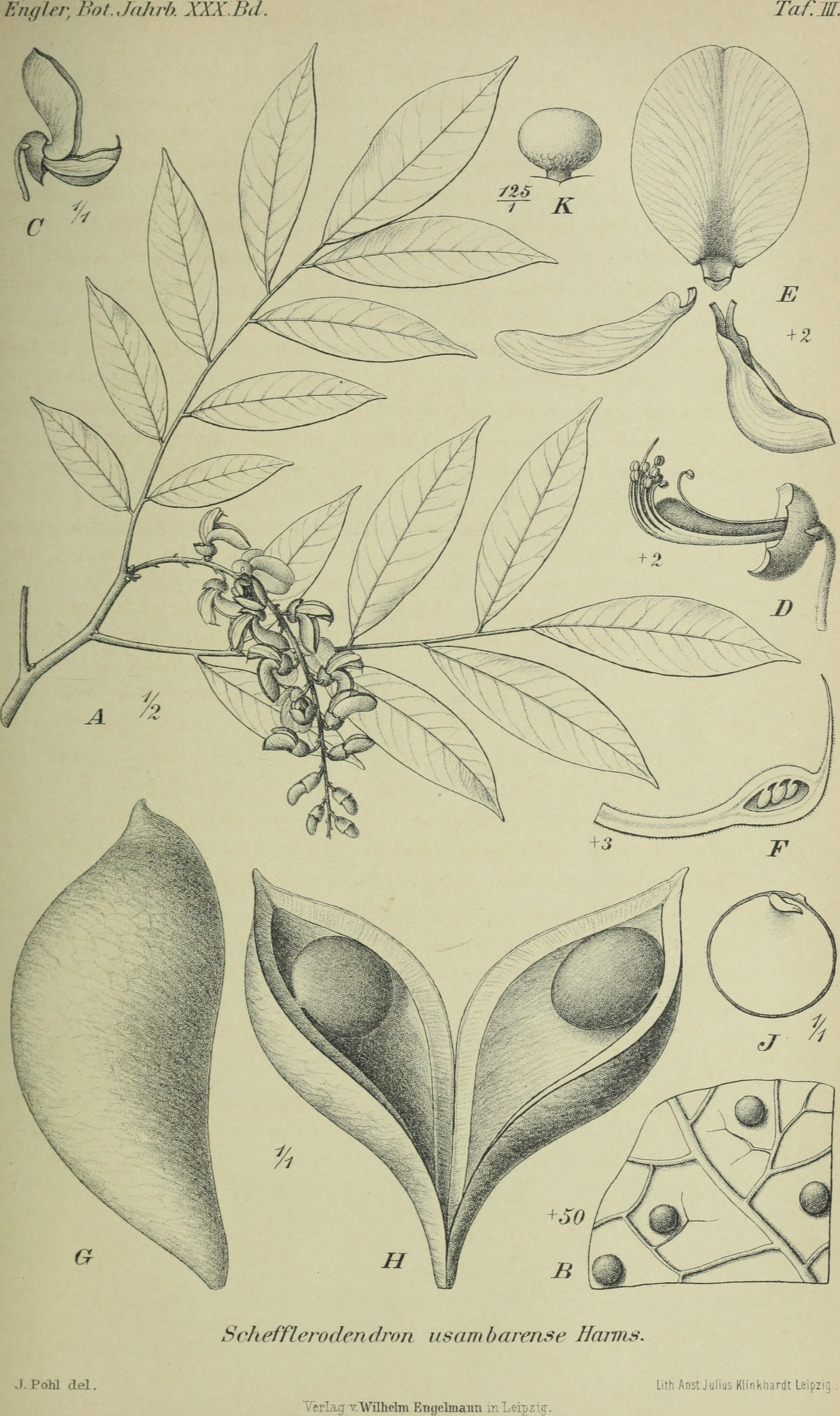
- Schefflerodendron usambarense

Scientific classification
- Kingdom: Plantae
- Clade: Tracheophytes
- Clade: Angiosperms
- Clade: Eudicots
- Clade: Rosids
- Order: Fabales
- Family: Fabaceae
- Subfamily: Faboideae
- Tribe: Millettieae
- Genus: Schefflerodendron; Harms (1901)

Species
- 4; see text

= Schefflerodendron =

Genus of legumes

Schefflerodendron is a genus of flowering plants in the family Fabaceae. It includes four species of trees native to tropical Africa, ranging from Cameroon to Tanzania and Angola. They grow in tropical rain forest and seasonally-dry forest, including disturbed areas. Three species are native to the Guineo-Congolian forests of west-central Africa, and one species (S. usambarense) also extends to the Zanzibar-Inhambane coastal forests of Tanzania.

== Species ==
As of September 2023, Plants of the World Online accepted the following species:

- Schefflerodendron adenopetalum (Taub.) Harms
- Schefflerodendron gabonense Pellegr.
- Schefflerodendron gilbertianum J.Léonard & Latour
- Schefflerodendron usambarense Harms
