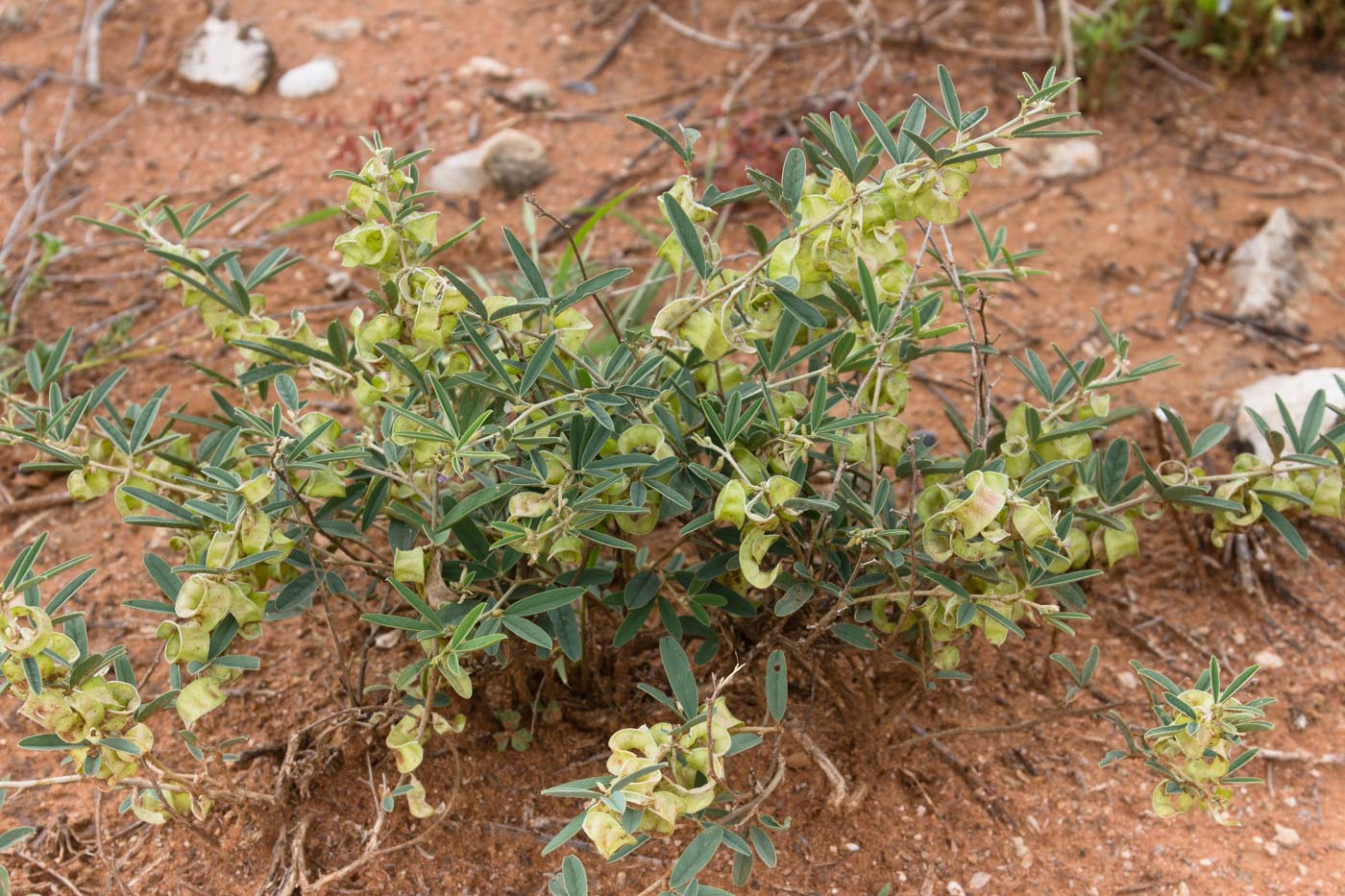
- Ptycholobium biflorum

Scientific classification
- Kingdom: Plantae
- Clade: Tracheophytes
- Clade: Angiosperms
- Clade: Eudicots
- Clade: Rosids
- Order: Fabales
- Family: Fabaceae
- Subfamily: Faboideae
- Tribe: Millettieae
- Genus: Ptycholobium; Harms (1915)

Species
- Ptycholobium biflorum (E.Mey.) Brummitt; Ptycholobium contortum (N.E.Br.) Brummitt; Ptycholobium plicatum (Oliv.) Harms

Synonyms
- Sylitra E.Mey. 1835

= Ptycholobium =

Genus of legumes

Ptycholobium is a genus of flowering plants in the family Fabaceae. It includes three species of shrubs and herbs native to sub-Saharan Africa and the southern Arabian Peninsula. Typical habitats include tropical seasonally-dry woodland, wooded grassland, and shrubland, usually in sandy soil. The genus belongs to the subfamily Faboideae. It may be synonymous with Tephrosia.
