= Hesperothamnus brachycalyx =

Scientific classification
- Kingdom: Plantae
- Clade: Tracheophytes
- Clade: Angiosperms
- Clade: Eudicots
- Clade: Rosids
- Order: Fabales
- Family: Fabaceae
- Subfamily: Faboideae
- Genus: Hesperothamnus
- Species: H. brachycalyx

Binomial name
- Hesperothamnus brachycalyx Rydb.

Species of flowering plant

Hesperothamnus brachycalyx is a species of flowering plants in the family Fabaceae. It is a low shrub with the bark of the stem dark - gray and young branches finely velutinous. It is native to southwest Mexico.
