= Fordia pauciflora =

Conservation status
- Vulnerable (IUCN 2.3)

Scientific classification
- Kingdom: Plantae
- Clade: Tracheophytes
- Clade: Angiosperms
- Clade: Eudicots
- Clade: Rosids
- Order: Fabales
- Family: Fabaceae
- Subfamily: Faboideae
- Genus: Fordia
- Species: F. pauciflora

Binomial name
- Fordia pauciflora Dunn

Species of legume

Fordia pauciflora is a species of flowering plant in the family Fabaceae. It is a tree found in Peninsular Malaysia and Thailand. It is threatened by habitat loss.

== Taxonomy ==
The specific epithet pauciflora is Latin for 'few-flowered'.
