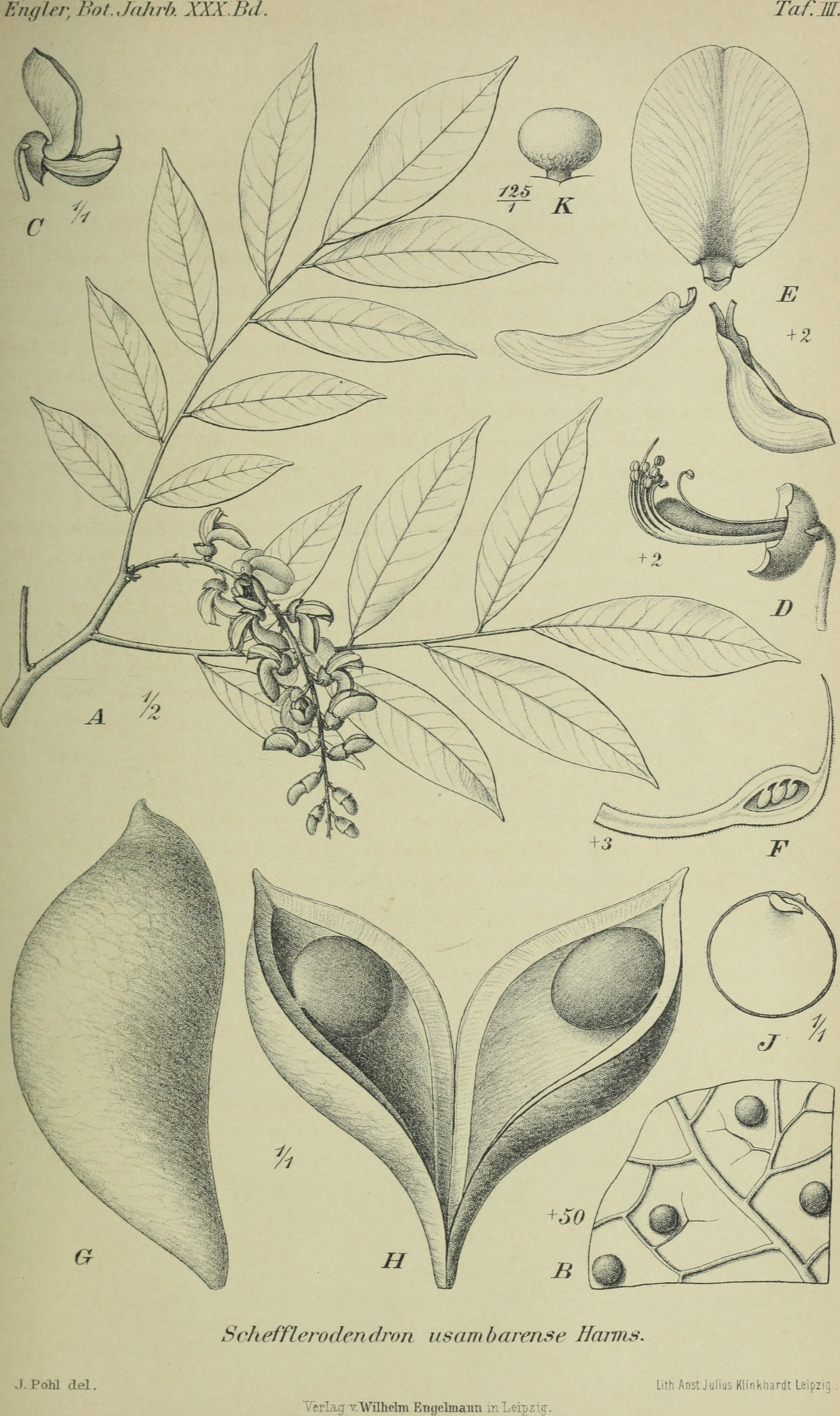

Conservation status
- Least Concern (IUCN 2.3)

Scientific classification
- Kingdom: Plantae
- Clade: Tracheophytes
- Clade: Angiosperms
- Clade: Eudicots
- Clade: Rosids
- Order: Fabales
- Family: Fabaceae
- Subfamily: Faboideae
- Genus: Schefflerodendron
- Species: S. usambarense

Binomial name
- Schefflerodendron usambarense Harms

= Schefflerodendron usambarense =

Species of legume

Schefflerodendron usambarense is a species of legume in the family Fabaceae. It is found in Angola, Cameroon, the Democratic Republic of the Congo, Gabon, and Tanzania.
