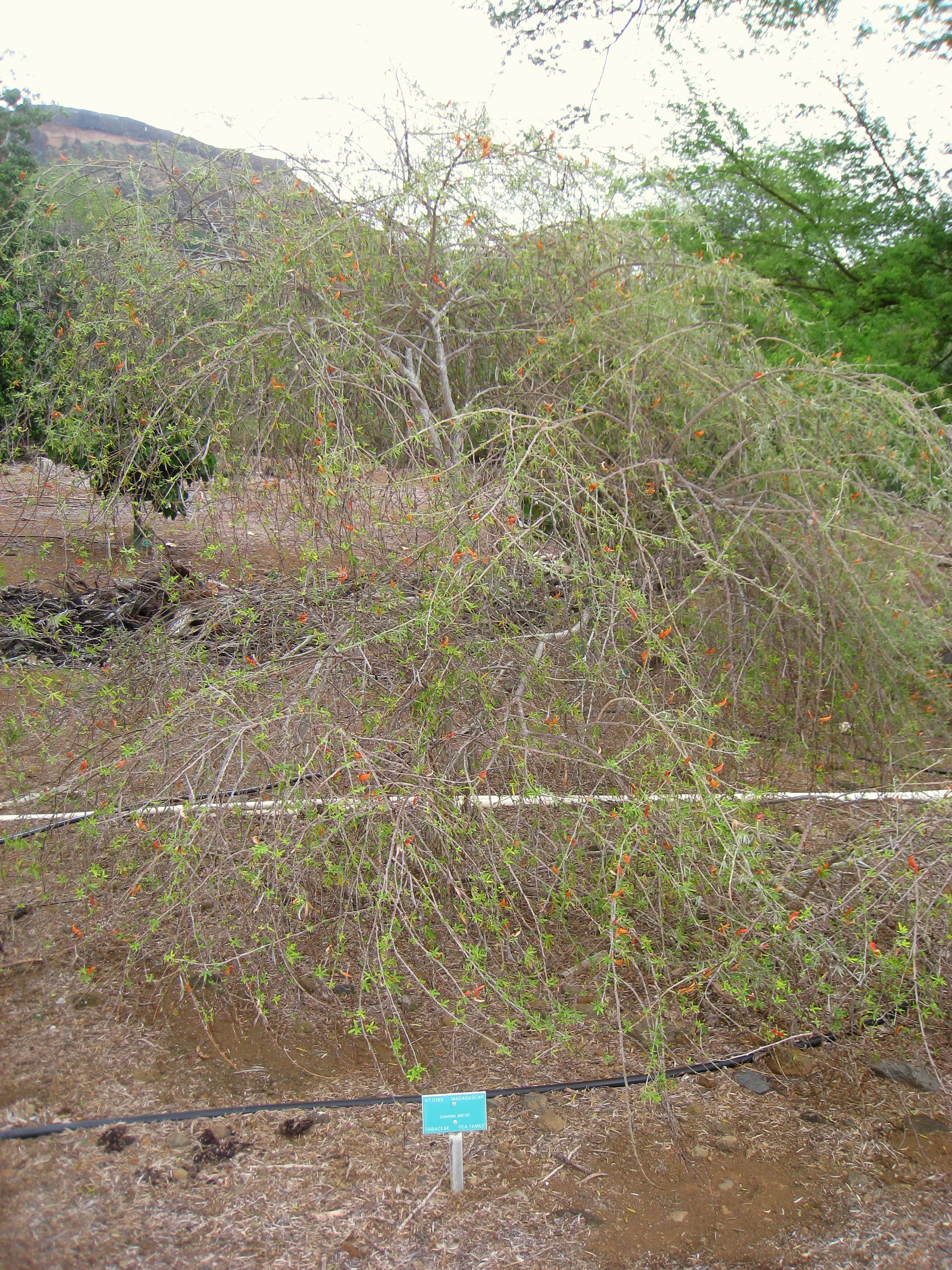
- Chadsia grevei

Scientific classification
- Kingdom: Plantae
- Clade: Tracheophytes
- Clade: Angiosperms
- Clade: Eudicots
- Clade: Rosids
- Order: Fabales
- Family: Fabaceae
- Subfamily: Faboideae
- Tribe: Millettieae
- Genus: Chadsia; Bojer

= Chadsia =

Species of flowering plant

Chadsia is a genus of flowering plants in the family Fabaceae. It includes nine species native to Madagascar. It belongs to subfamily Faboideae.

== Species ==
Accepted species in the genus include.

- Chadsia coluteifolia Baill.
- Chadsia flammea Bojer
- Chadsia grevei Drake
- Chadsia irodoensis Du Puy & Labat
- Chadsia longidentata R.Vig.
- Chadsia magnifica R.Vig.
- Chadsia racemosa Drake
- Chadsia salicina Baill.
- Chadsia versicolor Bojer
