= Pseudomacrochenus antennatus =

Scientific classification
- Domain: Eukaryota
- Kingdom: Animalia
- Phylum: Arthropoda
- Class: Insecta
- Order: Coleoptera
- Suborder: Polyphaga
- Infraorder: Cucujiformia
- Family: Cerambycidae
- Tribe: Lamiini
- Genus: Pseudomacrochenus
- Species: P. antennatus

Binomial name
- Pseudomacrochenus antennatus (Gahan, 1894)

Synonyms
- Mecotagus rufulosparsus Fairmaire, 1902; Pelargoderus antennatus Gahan, 1894; Pelargoderus apicalis Gahan, 1900; Pelargoderus perplexus Schwarzer, 1926

Species of beetle

Pseudomacrochenus antennatus is a species of beetle in the family Cerambycidae. It was described by Charles Joseph Gahan in 1894. It is known from Myanmar, India, China, Laos, and Vietnam.
