= Pyranthus =

Scientific classification
- Kingdom: Plantae
- Clade: Tracheophytes
- Clade: Angiosperms
- Clade: Eudicots
- Clade: Rosids
- Order: Fabales
- Family: Fabaceae
- Subfamily: Faboideae
- Tribe: Millettieae
- Genus: Pyranthus; Du Puy & Labat (1995)

Species
- six; see text

Genus of legumes

Pyranthus is a genus of flowering plants in the family Fabaceae. It belongs to subfamily Faboideae. It includes six species of shrubs and small trees endemic to Madagascar. Typical habitat is seasonally-dry tropical woodland and grassland, often on dunes or rocky outcrops, in western, southern, and central Madagascar.

- Pyranthus alasoa Du Puy & Labat
- Pyranthus ambatoanus (Baill.) Du Puy & Labat
- Pyranthus lucens (R.Vig.) Du Puy & Labat
- Pyranthus monanthus (Baker) Du Puy & Labat
- Pyranthus pauciflorus (Baker) Du Puy & Labat
- Pyranthus tullearensis (Baill.) Du Puy & Labat
