= Pseudomacrochenus affinis =

Scientific classification
- Kingdom: Animalia
- Phylum: Arthropoda
- Class: Insecta
- Order: Coleoptera
- Suborder: Polyphaga
- Infraorder: Cucujiformia
- Family: Cerambycidae
- Genus: Pseudomacrochenus
- Species: P. affinis

Binomial name
- Pseudomacrochenus affinis Breuning, 1960

Species of beetle

Pseudomacrochenus affinis is a species of beetle in the family Cerambycidae. It was described by Stephan von Breuning in 1960. It is known from India.
