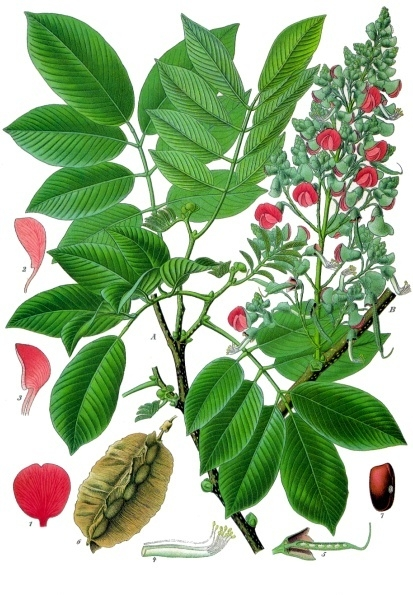

Conservation status
- Least Concern (IUCN 3.1)

Scientific classification
- Kingdom: Plantae
- Clade: Embryophytes
- Clade: Tracheophytes
- Clade: Spermatophytes
- Clade: Angiosperms
- Clade: Eudicots
- Clade: Rosids
- Order: Fabales
- Family: Fabaceae
- Subfamily: Faboideae
- Genus: Piscidia
- Species: P. piscipula

Binomial name
- Piscidia piscipula (L.) Sarg.

Synonyms
- Piscidia erythrina L. Ichthyomethia piscipula (L.) Hitchc. ex Sarg.

= Piscidia piscipula =

Florida fishpoison tree

Species of plant

Piscidia piscipula, commonly named Florida fishpoison tree, Jamaican dogwood, or fishfuddle, is a medium-sized, deciduous, tropical tree in the Fabaceae family. It is native to the Greater Antilles (except Puerto Rico), extreme southern Florida (primarily the Florida Keys) and the Bahamas, and the coastal region from Panama northward to the vicinity of Ocampo, Tamaulipas, Mexico. The native Taino of the West Indies discovered that extracts from the tree could sedate fish, allowing them to be caught by hand. This practice led to the tree's common names—fishpoison and fishfuddle. The tree has medicinal value as an analgesic and sedative.

The generic name is Latin for "fish killer", and the specific epithet is Latin for "little fish".

== Habitat ==
The Florida fishpoison tree grows in coastal zones. It prefers well-drained, sandy soils, with a top layer of humus. The tree has some tolerance to short-term storm surges of brackish water or seawater. Although it grows in coastal conditions, the tree is usually protected from direct salt spray by adjoining vegetation. Established trees are highly tolerant of drought. Its sensitivity to the cold limits Florida fishpoison tree to areas no colder than plant hardiness zone 11.

== Description ==
The Florida fishpoison tree attains medium size with heights of 12 to 15 m and bole diameters of 46 to 118 cm. An irregular, open crown develops with stout, erect branches.

Its deciduous leaves (9 to 23 cm long) are alternate and pinnately compound. Five to 11 leaflets (each 4 to 8 cm long) are present in an opposite arrangement. Leaflets are dark green above and distinctly paler grayish-green below with pubescence.

Its white flowers are tinged with red or pink. They appear in pea-like clusters in May and are attractive to bees. Trees potentially bloom when about 4 m tall and 4 years old. Flowers develop into a light brown, bean-like pod (8 to 10 cm long) with four papery wings. Ripening in July and August, the pods contain red-brown, beanlike seeds.

Stem bark is thin and olive gray in color with irregular dark patches and many smaller scales. The bark has an unpleasant odor and a distinctly acrid and bitter taste, causing a burning sensation in the mouth.

After removal from the ripe pod, seeds germinate in 8 to 10 days when sown about 6 mm deep in moist soil. Until seedlings become well established, they should be fertilized and watered. Cuttings placed in moist soil quickly sprout roots. In fact, rooting has been observed to occur so readily, posts made from fresh timber occasionally will take root unintentionally.

== Ecology ==
The Florida fishpoison tree is a larval host plant for several butterfly species, including: the native cassius blue butterfly (Leptotes cassius), hammock skipper (Polygonus leo) and the introduced fulvous hairstreak (Electrostrymon angelia).

== Uses ==
=== Cultivation ===
In areas with a suitable climate and soils, Florida fishpoison tree makes a hardy, medium-sized shade tree with attractive seasonal flowers. It is ideal for yards and along fence rows. The species is shade intolerant, requiring full sunlight for maximum development.

=== Lumber ===
The yellow-brown wood of fishpoison tree is resistant to decay, making its timber suitable for outdoor usage, such as boat building, fence posts, and poles. The dense, tight-grained wood is also used as a fuel, to make charcoal, and as a good carving material.

=== Fishing ===
Indigenous peoples all over the world used local poisonous plants to aid in catching fish, and because of this many plants bear common names descriptive of this use. Within its natural range, the Taino and other native tribes used an extract from the bark, roots, twigs, and leaves of Florida fishpoison tree to sedate fish, making them easier to catch. A number of chemicals present in the tree's tissues are toxic to fish, the principal one being the well-known rotenone.

=== Herbal medicine ===
P. piscipula can be toxic and should only be used under direction of a doctor. Dosage must be individually determined. It has been used in herbal medicine for treating nervous conditions, pain, and insomnia. Recent scientific studies in animals suggest that bark extracts may have potential for their anti-inflammatory, sedative, and antispasmodic effects.

== See also ==
- Bahamian dry forests
