= Disynstemon =

Scientific classification
- Kingdom: Plantae
- Clade: Tracheophytes
- Clade: Angiosperms
- Clade: Eudicots
- Clade: Rosids
- Order: Fabales
- Family: Fabaceae
- Subfamily: Faboideae
- Tribe: Millettieae
- Genus: Disynstemon; R.Vig. 1951
- Species: D. paullinioides

Binomial name
- Disynstemon paullinioides (Baker) M.Peltier

Synonyms
- Disynstemon madagascariense R.Vig.; Lonchocarpus paullinioides Baker

Genus of legumes

Disynstemon paullinioides is a species of flowering plants in the family Fabaceae. It belongs to the subfamily Faboideae. It is a liana that is native to Madagascar. It is the only member of the genus Disynstemon.
