= Pseudomacrochenus spinicollis =

Scientific classification
- Kingdom: Animalia
- Phylum: Arthropoda
- Class: Insecta
- Order: Coleoptera
- Suborder: Polyphaga
- Infraorder: Cucujiformia
- Family: Cerambycidae
- Genus: Pseudomacrochenus
- Species: P. spinicollis

Binomial name
- Pseudomacrochenus spinicollis Breuning, 1949

Species of beetle

Pseudomacrochenus spinicollis is a species of beetle in the family Cerambycidae. It was described by Stephan von Breuning in 1949. It is known from Laos, China and Myanmar.
