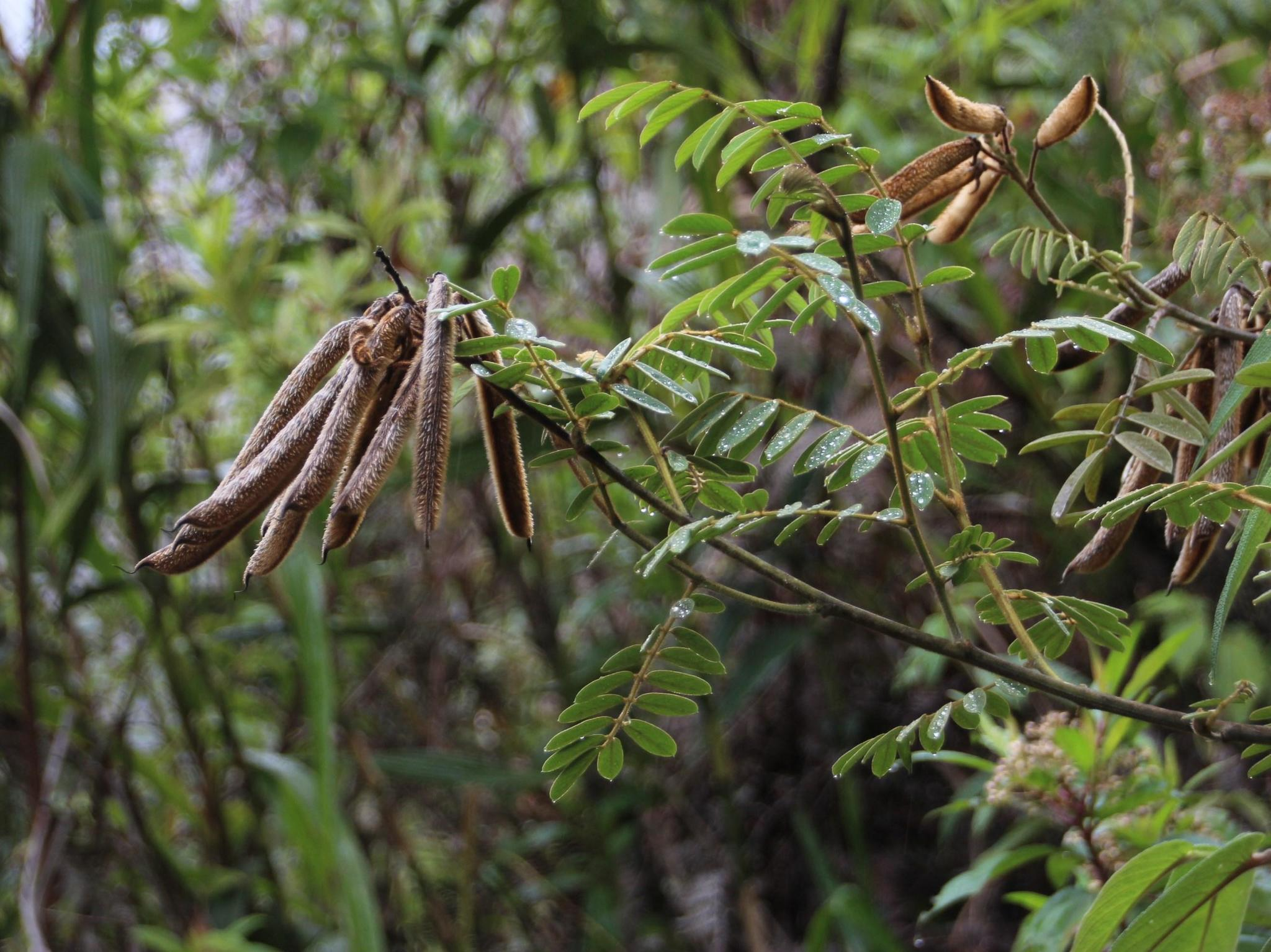
- Apurimacia boliviana

Scientific classification
- Kingdom: Plantae
- Clade: Embryophytes
- Clade: Tracheophytes
- Clade: Spermatophytes
- Clade: Angiosperms
- Clade: Eudicots
- Clade: Rosids
- Order: Fabales
- Family: Fabaceae
- Subfamily: Faboideae
- Tribe: Millettieae
- Genus: Apurimacia; Harms

Species
- Apurimacia boliviana (Britton) Lavin; Apurimacia dolichocarpa (Griseb.) Burkart

= Apurimacia =

Genus of legumes

Apurimacia is a genus of flowering plants in the family Fabaceae. It belongs to the subfamily Faboideae. It includes two species native to South America. The species Apurimacia dolichocarpa is a shrub endemic to the Sierras de Córdoba in Argentina. The species Apurimacia boliviana is a tree native to Peru and Bolivia. It is used as an insecticide in Peru.
