= Imbralyx unifoliatus =

Conservation status
- Vulnerable (IUCN 2.3)

Scientific classification
- Kingdom: Plantae
- Clade: Tracheophytes
- Clade: Angiosperms
- Clade: Eudicots
- Clade: Rosids
- Order: Fabales
- Family: Fabaceae
- Subfamily: Faboideae
- Genus: Imbralyx
- Species: I. unifoliatus

Binomial name
- Imbralyx unifoliatus (Prain) Z.Q.Song

Synonyms
- Fordia unifoliata (Prain) Dasuki & Schot; Millettia unifoliata Prain

Species of legume

Imbralyx unifoliatus, synonym Millettia unifoliata, is a species of legume in the family Fabaceae. It is a tree endemic to Peninsular Malaysia. It is threatened by habitat loss.
