= Ostryocarpus =

Scientific classification
- Kingdom: Plantae
- Clade: Embryophytes
- Clade: Tracheophytes
- Clade: Spermatophytes
- Clade: Angiosperms
- Clade: Eudicots
- Clade: Rosids
- Order: Fabales
- Family: Fabaceae
- Subfamily: Faboideae
- Tribe: Millettieae
- Genus: Ostryocarpus; Hook.f. (1849)

Genus of legumes

Ostryocarpus is a genus of flowering plants in the family Fabaceae. It belongs to the subfamily Faboideae. The name comes from ostryo- (Gk.: shell) and carpos (Gk.: fruit), referring to the shell-like pods.

The first specimens were collected by Theodore Vogel in 1851 on the Niger Expedition to West Africa. It was described by Sir Joseph Hooker. It is related to the genus Lonchocarpus and is distinguished from it by its diadelphous stamens and shell-like pod.

== Description ==
Ostryocarpus has glabrous exstipellate stamens, short stalked flowers on special short branchlets, hooked wings and keel petals and a short 2–3 ovuled gynoecium surrounded at the base by a fimbriate disk which is usually adnate to the base of the calyx.

== Distribution and habitat ==
Ostryocarpus is found in the tropical rainforests and seasonally dry forests of the Guineo-Congolian region of tropical West and west-central Africa. They grow as lianas or scandent shrubs and are often in riparian and mangrove habitats.

== Uses ==
They are used as fish poisons and for fish nets (fibre) and rope.

== Species ==
- Ostryocarpus riparius Hook.f.
- Ostryocarpus zenkerianus (Harms) Dunn
