= Fordia =

Scientific classification
- Kingdom: Plantae
- Clade: Tracheophytes
- Clade: Angiosperms
- Clade: Eudicots
- Clade: Rosids
- Order: Fabales
- Family: Fabaceae
- Subfamily: Faboideae
- Tribe: Millettieae
- Genus: Fordia; Hemsl.

Species
- See text

Genus of legumes

Fordia is a genus of flowering plants in the family Fabaceae, native from south China and Thailand to west and central Malesia. The genus was established by William Hemsley in 1886.

== Species ==
As of January 2023, Plants of the World Online accepted the following species:

- Fordia brachybotrys Merr.
- Fordia cauliflora Hemsl.
- Fordia fruticosa Craib
- Fordia johorensis Whitmore
- Fordia lanceolata Ridl.
- Fordia ophirensis Ridl.
- Fordia pauciflora Dunn
- Fordia rheophytica (Buijsen) Dasuki & Schot
- Fordia splendidissima (Blume ex Miq.) Buijsen
- Fordia stipularis (Prain) Dunn

Former species:

- Fordia incredibilis → Imbralyx incredibilis
