= Antheroporum =

Scientific classification
- Kingdom: Plantae
- Clade: Tracheophytes
- Clade: Angiosperms
- Clade: Eudicots
- Clade: Rosids
- Order: Fabales
- Family: Fabaceae
- Subfamily: Faboideae
- Tribe: Millettieae
- Genus: Antheroporum; Gagnep.

Genus of legumes

Antheroporum is a genus of flowering plants in the family Fabaceae. It belongs to the subfamily Faboideae. It includes five species native to southern China, Vietnam, and Thailand.

Five species are accepted:

- Antheroporum banaense L.K.Phan & J.E.Vidal – Vietnam
- Antheroporum harmandii Gagnep. (syn. Antheroporum glaucum) – China (southwestern and southeastern Yunnan, western Guangxi, and southwestern Guizhou) and Vietnam
- Antheroporum pierrei Gagnep. – Thailand and Vietnam
- Antheroporum puudjaae Mattapha & Tetsana – Thailand
- Antheroporum vidalii L.K.Phan – Vietnam
