= Pseudomacrochenus albipennis =

Scientific classification
- Domain: Eukaryota
- Kingdom: Animalia
- Phylum: Arthropoda
- Class: Insecta
- Order: Coleoptera
- Suborder: Polyphaga
- Infraorder: Cucujiformia
- Family: Cerambycidae
- Tribe: Lamiini
- Genus: Pseudomacrochenus
- Species: P. albipennis

Binomial name
- Pseudomacrochenus albipennis Chiang, 1981

Species of beetle

Pseudomacrochenus albipennis is a species of beetle in the family Cerambycidae. It was described by Chiang in 1981. It is known from China.
