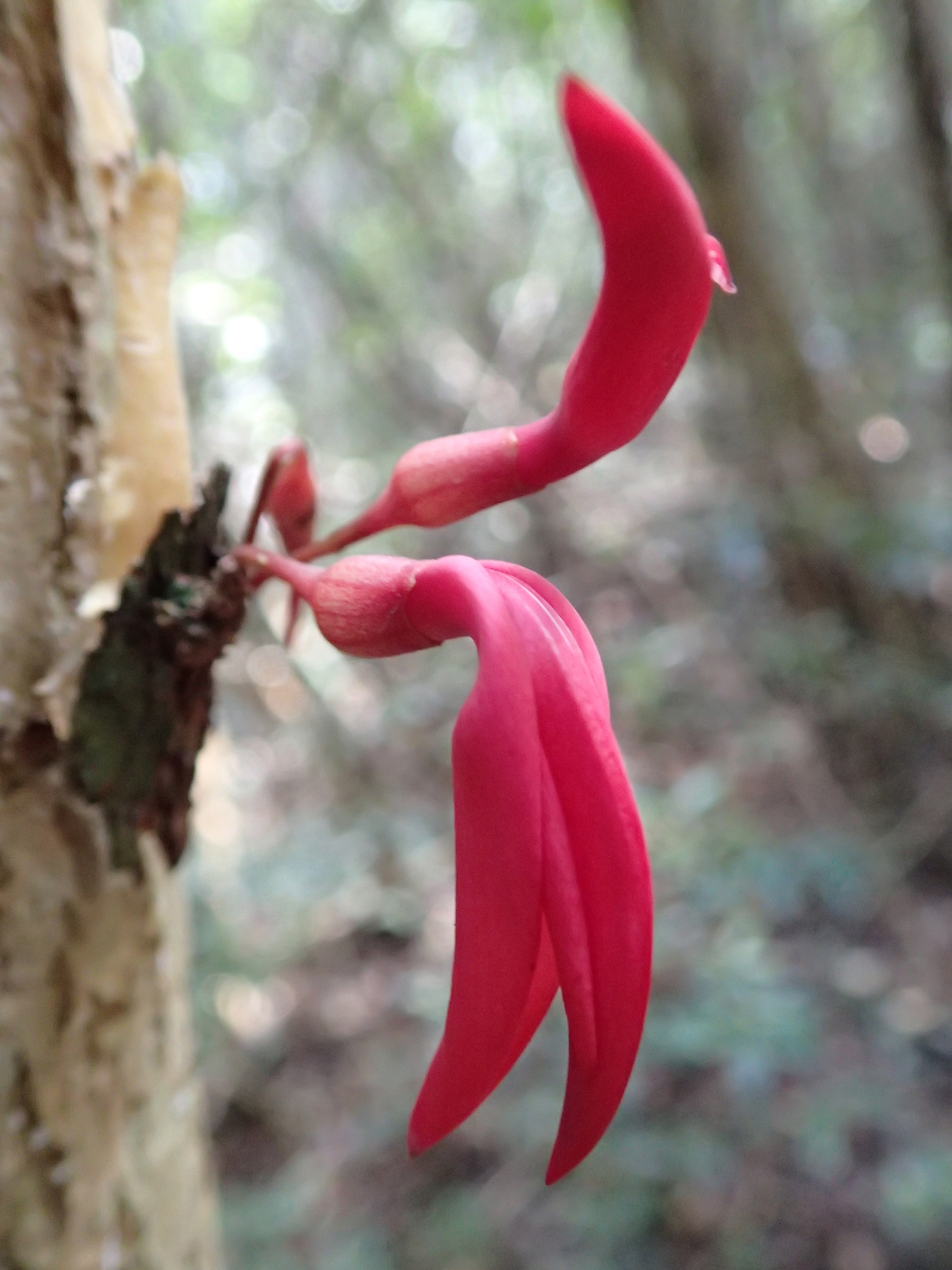
- Sylvichadsia grandidieri

Scientific classification
- Kingdom: Plantae
- Clade: Tracheophytes
- Clade: Angiosperms
- Clade: Eudicots
- Clade: Rosids
- Order: Fabales
- Family: Fabaceae
- Subfamily: Faboideae
- Tribe: Millettieae
- Genus: Sylvichadsia; Du Puy & Labat (1998)

Species
- Sylvichadsia grandidieri (Baill.) Du Puy & Labat; Sylvichadsia grandifolia (R.Vig.) Du Puy & Labat; Sylvichadsia macrophylla (R.Vig.) Du Puy & Labat; Sylvichadsia perrieri (R.Vig.) Du Puy & Labat

= Sylvichadsia =

Genus of legumes

Sylvichadsia is a genus of flowering plants in the family Fabaceae. It includes four species of trees, shrubs, or lianas endemic to Madagascar. They grow in humid tropical rain forest in eastern and northern Madagascar, often near rivers and streams. The genus belongs to subfamily Faboideae.
