= Dewevrea =

Scientific classification
- Kingdom: Plantae
- Clade: Tracheophytes
- Clade: Angiosperms
- Clade: Eudicots
- Clade: Rosids
- Order: Fabales
- Family: Fabaceae
- Subfamily: Faboideae
- Genus: Dewevrea; Micheli (1898)
- Species: D. bilabiata

Binomial name
- Dewevrea bilabiata Micheli (1898)

Synonyms
- Dewevrea gossweileri Baker f. (1928)

Genus of legumes

Dewevrea is a genus of flowering plants in the legume family, Fabaceae. It belongs to the subfamily Faboideae and tribe Millettieae. It contains a single species, Dewevrea bilabiata, a climber native to west-central Tropical Africa, ranging from Cameroon to Central African Republic, Gabon, Republic of the Congo, Cabinda, and DR Congo.
