= Hesperothamnus =

Scientific classification
- Kingdom: Plantae
- Clade: Tracheophytes
- Clade: Angiosperms
- Clade: Eudicots
- Clade: Rosids
- Order: Fabales
- Family: Fabaceae
- Subfamily: Faboideae
- Tribe: Millettieae
- Genus: Hesperothamnus; Brandegee (1919)

Synonyms
- Sclerothamnus Harms (1921), nom. illeg.

Genus of plants

Hesperothamnus is a genus of flowering plants belonging to the family Fabaceae. It includes five species native to Mexico.

- Hesperothamnus brachycalyx Rydb.
- Hesperothamnus ehrenbergii (Harms) Harms
- Hesperothamnus littoralis (Brandegee) Brandegee
- Hesperothamnus pentaphyllus (Harms) Harms
- Hesperothamnus purpusii Harms
