= Pseudomacrochenus =

Scientific classification
- Kingdom: Animalia
- Phylum: Arthropoda
- Class: Insecta
- Order: Coleoptera
- Suborder: Polyphaga
- Infraorder: Cucujiformia
- Family: Cerambycidae
- Subfamily: Lamiinae
- Tribe: Lamiini
- Genus: Pseudomacrochenus; Breuning, 1943

Type species
- Pelargoderus antennatus Gahan, 1894

Genus of beetles

Pseudomacrochenus is a genus of longhorn beetles in the subfamily Lamiinae, containing the following species:

- Pseudomacrochenus affinis Breuning, 1960
- Pseudomacrochenus albipennis Chiang, 1981
- Pseudomacrochenus antennatus (Gahan, 1894)
- Pseudomacrochenus oberthueri Breuning, 1955
- Pseudomacrochenus spinicollis Breuning, 1949
- Pseudomacrochenus wusuae He, Liu & Wang, 2017
