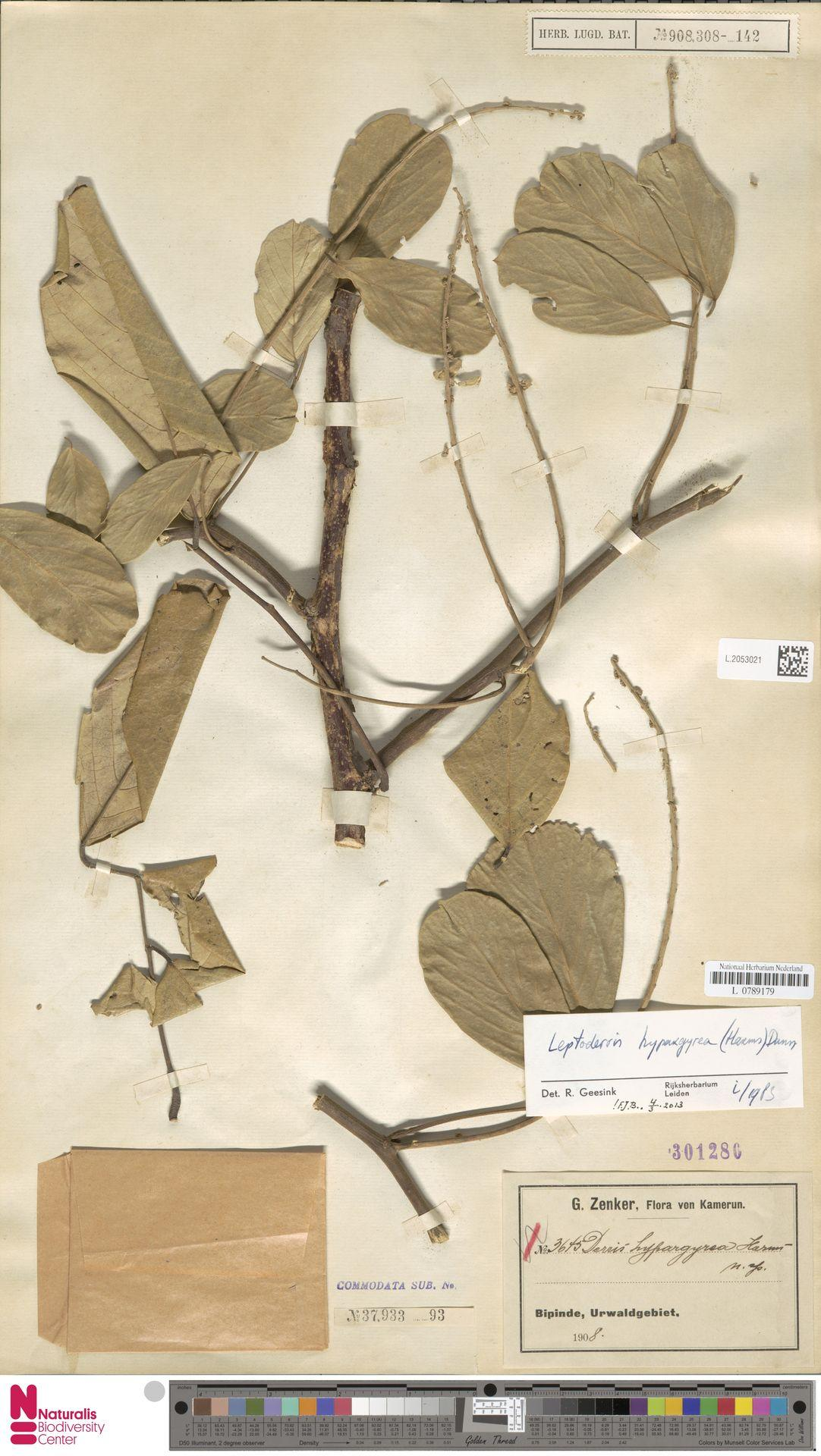

Scientific classification
- Kingdom: Plantae
- Clade: Tracheophytes
- Clade: Angiosperms
- Clade: Eudicots
- Clade: Rosids
- Order: Fabales
- Family: Fabaceae
- Subfamily: Faboideae
- Tribe: Millettieae
- Genus: Leptoderris; Dunn (1910)

Species
- 22; see text

= Leptoderris =

Genus of legumes

Leptoderris is a genus of flowering plants in the family Fabaceae. It includes 22 species native to tropical Africa, ranging from Senegal to Tanzania, Malawi, Zambia, and Angola. It belongs to the subfamily Faboideae.

Species are generally lianas and sometimes shrubs. They are found mostly in the Guineo-Congolian rain forest from West to Central Africa, extending into seasonally-dry forest, woodland, and bushland north, south, and east of the forest region. Two species are native to the Zambezian region, and one is native to the Zanzibar–Inhambane forests of coastal eastern Africa.

22 species are accepted:

- Leptoderris aurantiaca Dunn
- Leptoderris brachyptera (Benth.) Dunn
- Leptoderris burundiensis Bamps & Champl.
- Leptoderris congolensis (De Wild.) Dunn
- Leptoderris coriacea De Wild.
- Leptoderris cyclocarpa Dunn
- Leptoderris fasciculata (Benth.) Dunn
- Leptoderris gabonica Breteler
- Leptoderris glabrata (Welw. ex Baker) Dunn
- Leptoderris harmsiana Dunn
- Leptoderris hypargyrea Dunn
- Leptoderris ledermannii Harms
- Leptoderris macrothyrsa Dunn
- Leptoderris micrantha Dunn
- Leptoderris miegei Aké Assi & Mangenot
- Leptoderris nobilis (Welw. ex Baker) Dunn
- Leptoderris oxytropis Harms
- Leptoderris reygaertii De Wild.
- Leptoderris robusta Breteler
- Leptoderris sassandrensis Jongkind
- Leptoderris tomentella Harms
- Leptoderris trifoliolata Hepper
