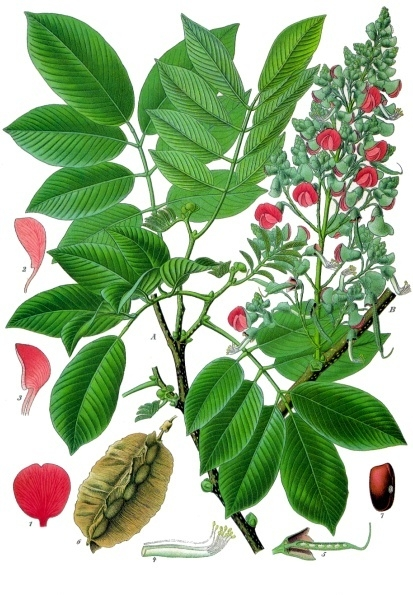
- Piscidia piscipula

Scientific classification
- Kingdom: Plantae
- Clade: Tracheophytes
- Clade: Angiosperms
- Clade: Eudicots
- Clade: Rosids
- Order: Fabales
- Family: Fabaceae
- Subfamily: Faboideae
- Tribe: Millettieae
- Genus: Piscidia; L., nom. cons.

Type species
- Piscidia piscipula (L.) Sarg.

Species
- 7; see text

Synonyms
- Canizaresia Britton; Ichthyomethia P.Browne; Ichtyomethia Kuntze; Piscipula Loefl., nom. superfl.

= Piscidia =

Genus of legumes

Piscidia is a genus of flowering plants in subfamily Faboideae of the family Fabaceae. It includes seven species of trees, and rarely shrubs, native to the tropical Americas, ranging from northern Mexico and Florida through Central America and the Caribbean to Venezuela and Peru. Typical habitats include seasonally-dry tropical forest, woodland, and bushland, often on rocky hills, with some species restricted to limestone substrates.

The generic name is derived from the Latin words piscis, meaning "fish," and caedo, meaning "to kill." It refers to the use of extracts from the plant to poison fish.

== Species ==
Seven species are accepted:

- Piscidia carthagenensis Jacq.
- Piscidia cubensis Urb.
- Piscidia ekmanii Rudd
- Piscidia grandifolia (Donn.Sm.) I.M.Johnst.
- Piscidia havanensis (Britton & P.Wilson) Urb. & Ekman
- Piscidia mollis Rose
- Piscidia piscipula (L.) Sarg.

=== Formerly placed here ===
- Sesbania punicea (Cav.) Benth. (as P. punicea Cav.)
