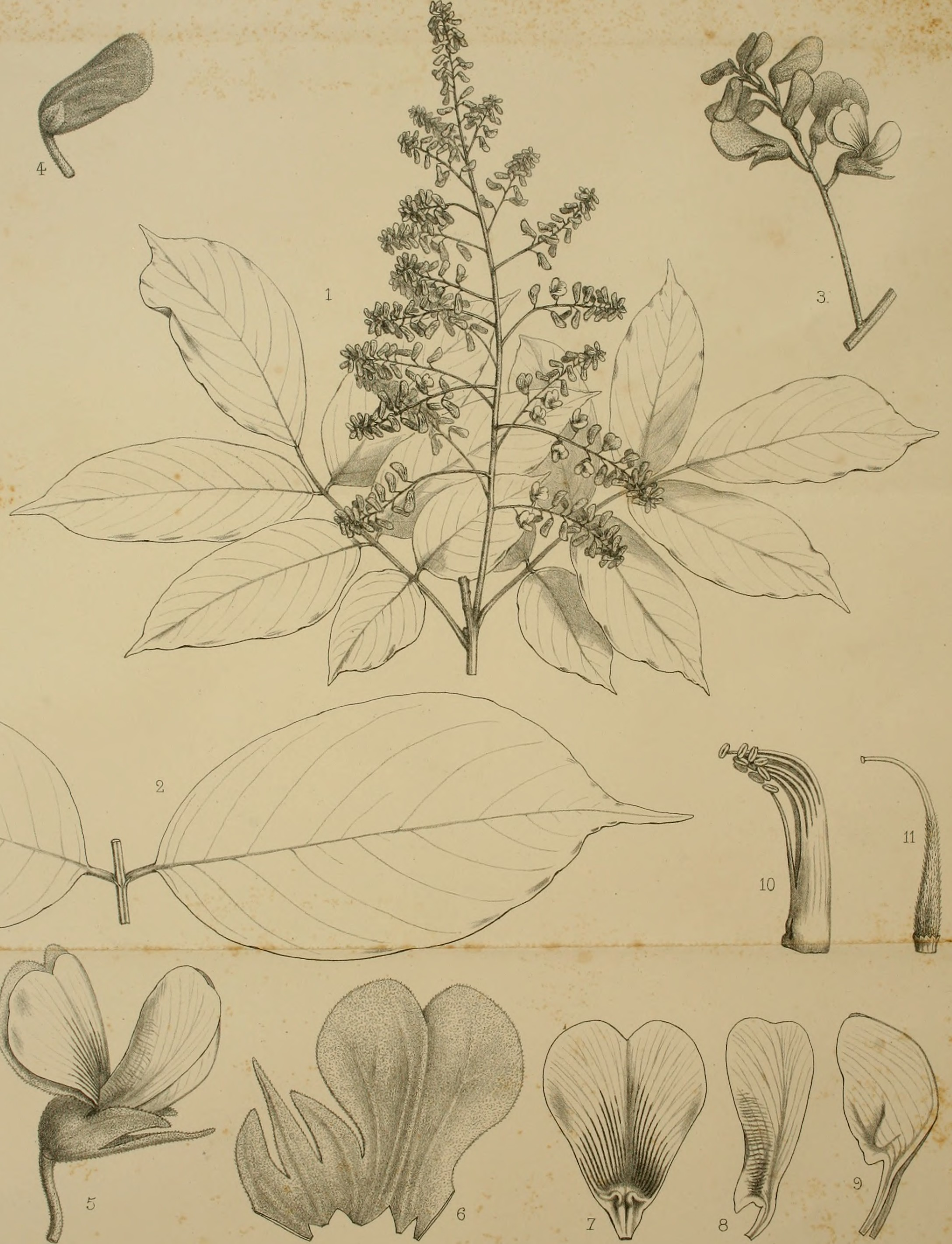
- Platysepalum violaceum

Scientific classification
- Kingdom: Plantae
- Clade: Tracheophytes
- Clade: Angiosperms
- Clade: Eudicots
- Clade: Rosids
- Order: Fabales
- Family: Fabaceae
- Subfamily: Faboideae
- Tribe: Millettieae
- Genus: Platysepalum; Welw. ex Baker (1871)

Species
- 13; see text

= Platysepalum =

Genus of legumes

Platysepalum is a genus of flowering plants in the family Fabaceae. It includes 13 species of small trees, shrubs, or lianas native to tropical Africa, from Senegal to Tanzania and south to Angola and Mozambique. Most species are native to the Guineo-Congolian forests of west and west-central Africa, and one is native to the tropical Zanzibar-Inhambane coastal forests of Africa's eastern (Indian Ocean) coast. Habitats include tropical rain forest and seasonally-dry lowland forests, often in disturbed areas. It belongs to subfamily Faboideae.

Species in the genus include:

- Platysepalum bambidiense Maesen
- Platysepalum chevalieri Harms
- Platysepalum chrysophyllum Hauman
- Platysepalum cuspidatum Taub.
- Platysepalum ferrugineum Taub.
- Platysepalum hirsutum (Dunn) Hepper
- Platysepalum hypoleucum Taub.
- Platysepalum inopinatum Harms
- Platysepalum poggei Taub.
- Platysepalum pulchrum Louis ex Hauman
- Platysepalum scaberulum Harms
- Platysepalum vanderystii De Wild.
- Platysepalum violaceum Welw. ex Baker
