= Imbralyx leucanthus =

Conservation status
- Least Concern (IUCN 3.1)

Scientific classification
- Kingdom: Plantae
- Clade: Embryophytes
- Clade: Tracheophytes
- Clade: Spermatophytes
- Clade: Angiosperms
- Clade: Eudicots
- Clade: Rosids
- Order: Fabales
- Family: Fabaceae
- Subfamily: Faboideae
- Genus: Imbralyx
- Species: I. leucanthus

Binomial name
- Imbralyx leucanthus (Kurz) Z.Q.Song

Varieties
- 2; see text

Synonyms
- Millettia leucantha Kurz (1873)

Species of legume

Millettia leucantha or sathon is a species of plant in the legume family, Fabaceae. It is a perennial flowering tree native to Indo-China – Cambodia, Laos, Myanmar, Thailand, and Vietnam – as well as Bangladesh and southern Yunnan province in China.

It is the provincial tree and flower of Khorat or Nakhon Ratchasima Province in Isaan (Thailand), where it is known as sathon (สาธร).

== Varieties ==
Two varieties are recognized:

- Imbralyx leucanthus var. buteoides (Gagnep.) Z.Q.Song (synonyms Millettia buteoides Gagnep., Millettia leucantha var. buteoides (Gagnep.) L.K.Phan, Millettia bassacensis Gagnep., and Millettia buteoides var. siamensis Craib) – Cambodia, Laos, Thailand, and Vietnam
- Imbralyx leucanthus var. leucanthus (synonyms Millettia latifolia Dunn, Millettia leucantha var. latifolia (Dunn) L.K.Phan, Millettia pendula Benth., Millettia utilis Dunn, Phaseoloides pendulum (Benth.) Kuntze, and Pongamia pendula Graham) – Bangladesh, Myanmar, Thailand, and southern Yunnan

== Uses ==
Sathon sauce is a flavouring sauce used in Isaan cuisine. The leaves of two species of Millettia are used for making sathon sauce: Millettia utilis and Millettia leucantha var. buteoides (a.k.a. Imbralyx leucanthus var. buteoides). This sauce used for cooking is the only OTOP product made from the sathon tree.

== See also ==
- Millettia laurentii
- Senna siamea
