= Fordia lanceolata =

Conservation status
- Vulnerable (IUCN 2.3)

Scientific classification
- Kingdom: Plantae
- Clade: Tracheophytes
- Clade: Angiosperms
- Clade: Eudicots
- Clade: Rosids
- Order: Fabales
- Family: Fabaceae
- Subfamily: Faboideae
- Genus: Fordia
- Species: F. lanceolata

Binomial name
- Fordia lanceolata Ridley

Species of legume

Fordia lanceolata is a species of flowering plant in the family Fabaceae. It is a tree endemic to Peninsular Malaysia. It is threatened by habitat loss.
