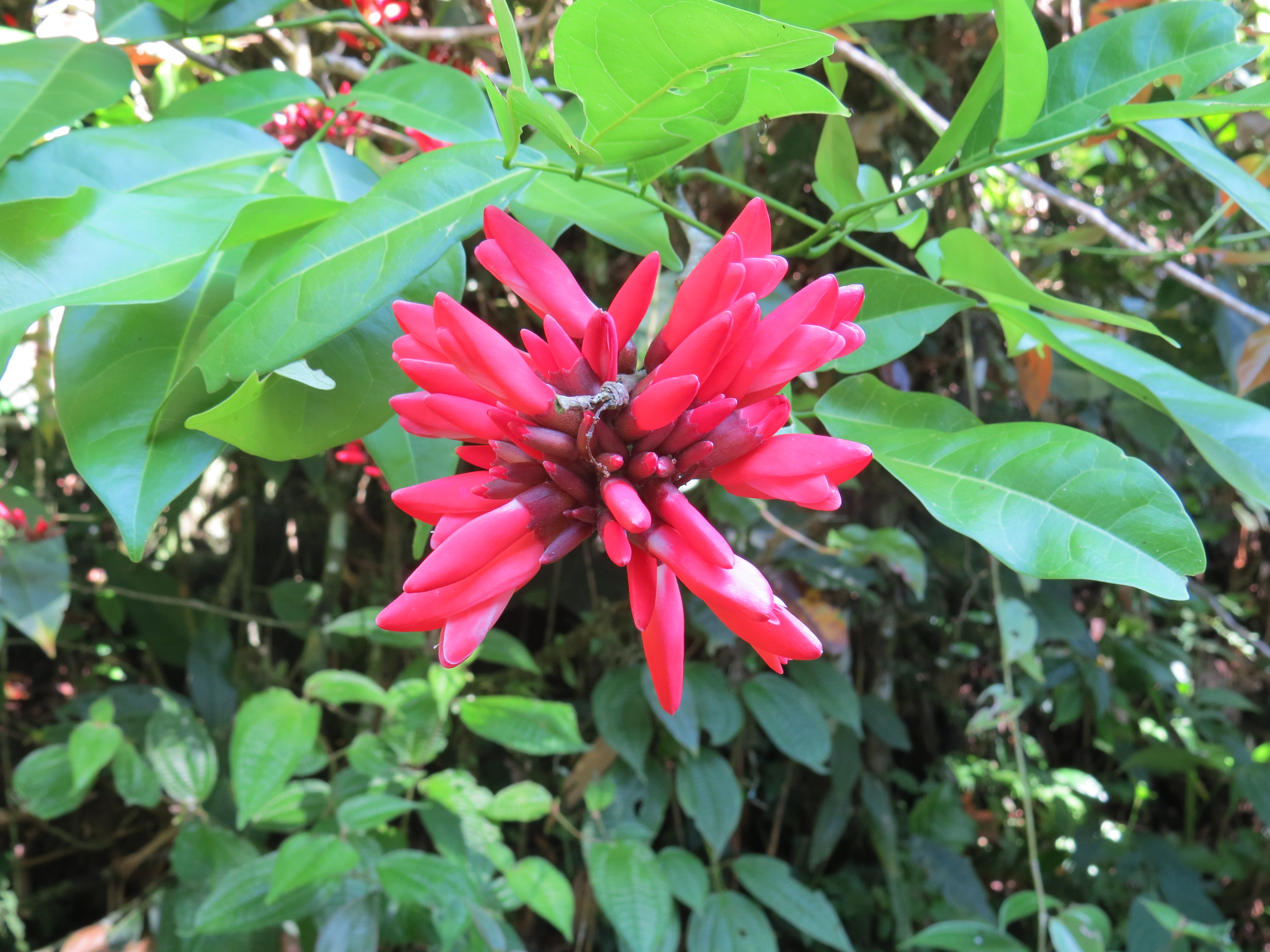
- Dahlstedtia pentaphylla in Brazil

Scientific classification
- Kingdom: Plantae
- Clade: Embryophytes
- Clade: Tracheophytes
- Clade: Spermatophytes
- Clade: Angiosperms
- Clade: Eudicots
- Clade: Rosids
- Order: Fabales
- Family: Fabaceae
- Subfamily: Faboideae
- Tribe: Millettieae
- Genus: Dahlstedtia; Malme (1905)

Species
- 16; see text

= Dahlstedtia =

Genus of legumes

Dahlstedtia is a genus of flowering plants in the legume family, Fabaceae. It belongs to the subfamily Faboideae. The genus includes 16 species, which range from Costa Rica to Panama, and from Ecuador and northeastern Brazil to northeastern Argentina.

- Dahlstedtia araripensis (Benth.) M.J.Silva & A.M.G.Azevedo
- Dahlstedtia bahiana (A.M.G.Azevedo) M.J.Silva & A.M.G.Azevedo
- Dahlstedtia burkartii M.J.Silva & A.M.G.Azevedo
- Dahlstedtia calcarata (F.J.Herm.) M.J.Silva & A.M.G.Azevedo
- Dahlstedtia castaneifolia (M.J.Silva & A.M.G.Azevedo) M.J.Silva & A.M.G.Azevedo
- Dahlstedtia confertiflora (Benth.) M.J.Silva & A.M.G.Azevedo
- Dahlstedtia dehiscens M.J.Silva & A.M.G.Azevedo
- Dahlstedtia floribunda (Vogel) M.J.Silva & A.M.G.Azevedo
- Dahlstedtia glaziovii (Taub.) M.J.Silva & A.M.G.Azevedo
- Dahlstedtia grandiflora (A.M.G.Azevedo) M.J.Silva & A.M.G.Azevedo
- Dahlstedtia hylobia (Harms) M.J.Silva & A.M.G.Azevedo
- Dahlstedtia lewisiana M.J.Silva & A.M.G.Azevedo
- Dahlstedtia muehlbergiana (Hassl.) M.J.Silva & A.M.G.Azevedo
- Dahlstedtia peckoltii (Wawra) M.J.Silva & A.M.G.Azevedo
- Dahlstedtia pentaphylla (Taub.) Burkart
- Dahlstedtia pinnata (Benth.) Malme
