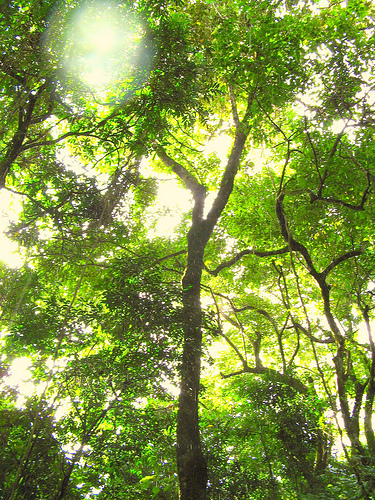
- Platycyamus regnellii

Scientific classification
- Kingdom: Plantae
- Clade: Tracheophytes
- Clade: Angiosperms
- Clade: Eudicots
- Clade: Rosids
- Order: Fabales
- Family: Fabaceae
- Subfamily: Faboideae
- Tribe: Millettieae
- Genus: Platycyamus; Benth. (1862)

= Platycyamus (plant) =

Genus of legumes

Platycyamus is a genus of flowering plants in the family Fabaceae. It includes two species of trees native to Brazil, Bolivia, and Peru. They grow in the Amazon and Atlantic rain forests of the Amazon Basin and eastern coastal Brazil. The genus belongs to subfamily Faboideae.

- Platycyamus regnellii Benth.
- Platycyamus ulei Harms
