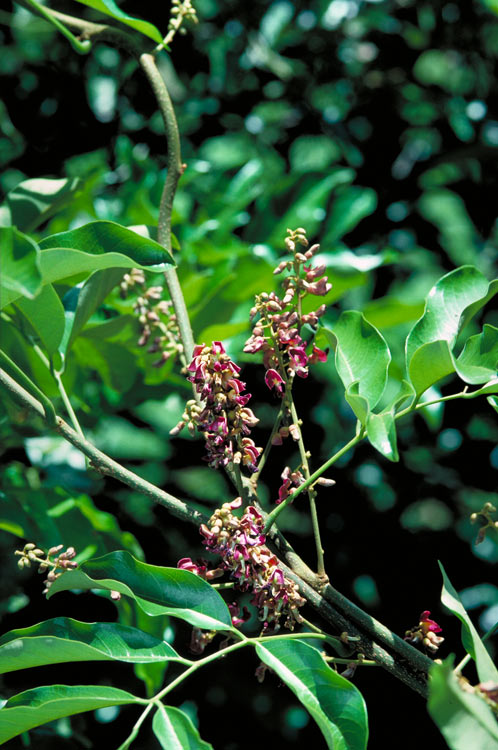
- In flower

Conservation status
- Least Concern (NCA)

Scientific classification
- Kingdom: Plantae
- Clade: Tracheophytes
- Clade: Angiosperms
- Clade: Eudicots
- Clade: Rosids
- Order: Fabales
- Family: Fabaceae
- Subfamily: Faboideae
- Tribe: Millettieae
- Genus: Ibatiria; W.E.Cooper
- Species: I. furfuracea

Binomial name
- Ibatiria furfuracea W.E.Cooper

= Ibatiria =

Genus of flowering plants

Ibatiria is a genus of flowering plants in the legume family, Fabaceae. It includes a single species, Ibatiria furfuracea, which is endemic to Queensland, Australia, and was described by Australian botanist Wendy Elizabeth Cooper in 2019.
