= Craspedolobium =

Scientific classification
- Kingdom: Plantae
- Clade: Tracheophytes
- Clade: Angiosperms
- Clade: Eudicots
- Clade: Rosids
- Order: Fabales
- Family: Fabaceae
- Subfamily: Faboideae
- Tribe: Millettieae
- Genus: Craspedolobium; Harms (1921)
- Species: C. unijugum

Binomial name
- Craspedolobium unijugum (Gagnep.) Z.Wei & Pedley (2010)

Synonyms
- Callerya unijuga (Gagnep.) H.Sun (2006); Craspedolobium schochii Harms (1921); Millettia unijuga Gagnep. (1913)

Genus of legumes

Craspedolobium is a genus of flowering plants in the family Fabaceae. It belongs to the subfamily Faboideae. It contains a single species, Craspedolobium unijugum, a scrambling perennial or subshrub native to Indochina and southern China. Craspedolobium schochii was formerly accepted, but has since been synonymized with C. unijugum.
