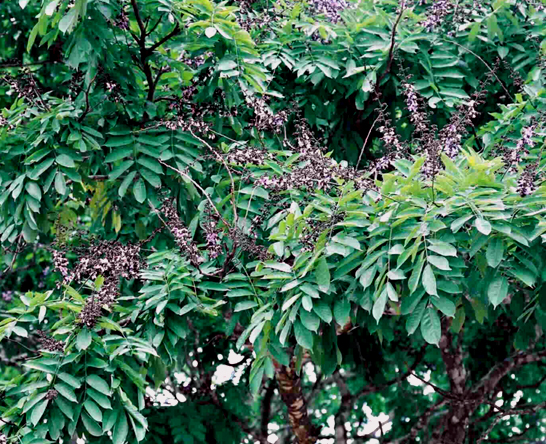
- Millettia laurentii, foliage and flowers

Scientific classification
- Kingdom: Plantae
- Clade: Tracheophytes
- Clade: Angiosperms
- Clade: Eudicots
- Clade: Rosids
- Order: Fabales
- Family: Fabaceae
- Subfamily: Faboideae
- Clade: Meso-Papilionoideae
- Clade: Non-protein amino acid-accumulating clade
- Clade: Millettioids
- Tribe: Millettieae; Miq.

= Millettieae =

Tribe of legumes

The tribe Millettieae is one of the subdivisions of the plant family Fabaceae.

The following genera are recognized by the USDA. In 2019, some genera USDA places in this tribe were moved to tribe Wisterieae; these are listed at the end.

- Aganope Miq. (Note: Possibly synonymous with Ostryocarpus)
- Antheroporum Gagnep.
- Apurimacia Harms
- Austrosteenisia R. Geesink
- Brachypterum (Wight & Arn.) Benth. (Note: Possibly synonymous with Derris)
- Burkilliodendron Sastry
- Chadsia Bojer
- Craibia Harms & Dunn
- Craspedolobium Harms
- Dahlstedtia Malme
- Dalbergiella Baker f.
- Deguelia Aubl.
- Derris Lour.
- Dewevrea Micheli
- Disynstemon R. Vig.
- Fordia Hemsl.
- Hesperothamnus Brandegee (Note: Possibly synonymous with Millettia)
- Ibatiria W.E.Cooper
- Kunstleria Prain
- Leptoderris Dunn
- Lonchocarpus Kunth
- Millettia Wight & Arn.
- Muellera L. f. (Note: Possibly synonymous with Lonchocarpus)
- Mundulea (DC.) Benth.
- Ostryocarpus Hook. f.
- Paratephrosia Domin (Note: Possibly synonymous with Tephrosia)
- Philenoptera Hochst. ex A.Rich. (Note: Possibly synonymous with Lonchocarpus)
- Piscidia L.
- Platycyamus Benth.
- Platysepalum Welw. ex Baker
- Pongamiopsis R. Vig.
- Ptycholobium Harms (Note: Possibly synonymous with Tephrosia)
- Pyranthus Du Puy & Labat
- Requienia DC.
- Schefflerodendron Harms
- Sylvichadsia Du Puy & Labat
- Tephrosia Pers.

Genera moved to tribe Wisterieae:

- Afgekia Craib
- Austrocallerya J.Compton & Schrire
- Callerya Endl.
- Endosamara R. Geesink
- Kanburia J.Compton et al.
- Nanhaia J.Compton & Schrire
- Sarcodum Lour.
- Serawaia J.Compton & Schrire
- Sigmoidala J.Compton & Schrire
- Whitfordiodendron Elmer
- Wisteria Nutt.
- Wisteriopsis J.Compton & Schrire
