= Gustav Adolf Hugo Dahlstedt =

Swedish botanist (1856–1934)

Gustav Adolf Hugo Dahlstedt (8 February 1856, Linköping – 2 October 1934, Lidingö) was a Swedish botanist who worked at the Bergianska Trädgården and Naturhistoriska Riksmuseet in Stockholm. In 1907 he received his honorary doctorate.

Dahlstedt specialized in research of the plant genera Taraxacum and Hieracium, of which he circumscribed many species. The botanical genus Dahlstedtia from the subfamily Faboideae is named in his honor, as are taxa with the specific taxa of dahlstedtii, an example being Taraxacum dahlstedtii, a plant sometimes referred to as "Dahlstedt's dandelion". Dahlstedt edited several exsiccata series focussed on Hieracium and Taraxacum specimens, namely Hieracia exsiccata (1889-1891), Herbarium Hieraciorum Scandinaviae distributed from 1892 until 1911 and Taraxaca Scandinavica exsiccata.

== Selected works ==
- "Bidrag Till Sydöstra Sveriges ... Hieracium-flora", etc., (1890).
- "Adnotationes de Hieraciis Scandinavicis, Anteckningar till kännedomen om Skandinaviens Hieracium-flora. I. Af Hugo Dahlstedt", (1893).
- "Studien über süd- und central-amerikanische Peperomien", (1900); Studies on South and Central American Peperomia.
- "Beiträge zur Kenntnis der Hieracium-Flora", (1901); Contributions to the knowledge of Hieracium.
- "De Svenska Arterna Av Släktet Taraxacum: Erythrosperma. Obliqua. I.. II." (1921).
- "De Svenska Arterna Av Släktet Taraxacum. III. Dissimilia. IV. Palustria. V. Ceratophora. VI. Arctica. VII. Glabra", etc. (1928).
- "Ueber einige orientalische Taraxacum-Arten", (1929); On some Oriental Taraxacum species.
