= Native wisteria =

Native wisteria may refer to:

- Austrocallerya australis (synonyms include Callerya australis)
- Austrocallerya megasperma (synonyms including Callerya megasperma, Millettia megasperma, Wisteria megasperma), a woody vine native to Australasia, including Queensland and New South Wales
- Hardenbergia comptoniana, a woody vine native to Western Australia
