= Porphyrosela dismochrysa =

Scientific classification
- Domain: Eukaryota
- Kingdom: Animalia
- Phylum: Arthropoda
- Class: Insecta
- Order: Lepidoptera
- Family: Gracillariidae
- Genus: Porphyrosela
- Species: P. dismochrysa

Binomial name
- Porphyrosela dismochrysa (Lower, 1897)

Synonyms
- Lithocolletis dismochrysa Lower, 1897; Lithocolletis desmochrysa Turner, 1940; Porphyrosela nigricansella (Tepper, 1899)

Species of moth

Porphyrosela dismochrysa is a moth of the family Gracillariidae. It is known from the Australian states of New South Wales and South Australia.

The larvae feed on Hardenbergia species (including Hardenbergia ovata), Kennedia nigricans and Meibomia viridiflora. They probably mine the leaves of their host plant.

This species was first described by Oswald Bertram Lower in 1897.
