= Porphyrosela hardenbergiella =

Scientific classification
- Kingdom: Animalia
- Phylum: Arthropoda
- Clade: Pancrustacea
- Class: Insecta
- Order: Lepidoptera
- Family: Gracillariidae
- Genus: Porphyrosela
- Species: P. hardenbergiella

Binomial name
- Porphyrosela hardenbergiella (Wise, 1957)

Synonyms
- Lithocolletis hardenbergiella Wise, 1957; Phyllonorycter hardenbergiella (Wise, 1957)

Species of moth

Porphyrosela hardenbergiella is a moth of the family Gracillariidae. First identified in a suburban garden in Epsom, Auckland, New Zealand in 1955 feeding on Hardenbergia, the species was likely introduced from Australia, although no members of the species have been found there.

== Taxonomy ==
The species was first described as Lithocolletis hardenbergiella in 1957 by Keith Arthur John Wise, who described the species based on specimens taken from Hardenbergia growing in a suburban garden in Epsom, Auckland, New Zealand that were first noticed in April 1954. Wise described this as a new species due to morphological differences seen compared to Australian species of Lithocolletis. Specimens collected in 1955 were placed in the collections of the Plant Diseases Division of the Department of Scientific and Industrial Research, and in the Natural History Museum, Berlin.

The species was placed in the genus Porphyrosela by Tosio Kumata in 1993.

== Description ==
The moth is darkly coloured with white markings, and has a length of 2 mm (0.079 in).

== Behaviour ==
The larvae feed on Hardenbergia species. They mine the leaves of their host plant.

== Distribution ==
It is known from New Zealand, but may be adventive, since the host plant is Australian. The colony known to Wise has been destroyed since its discovery. This species was last collected in New Zealand in 1955 but as of 2019 was still not known from Australia. Porphyrosela hardenbergiella is considered an adventive non-native species.
