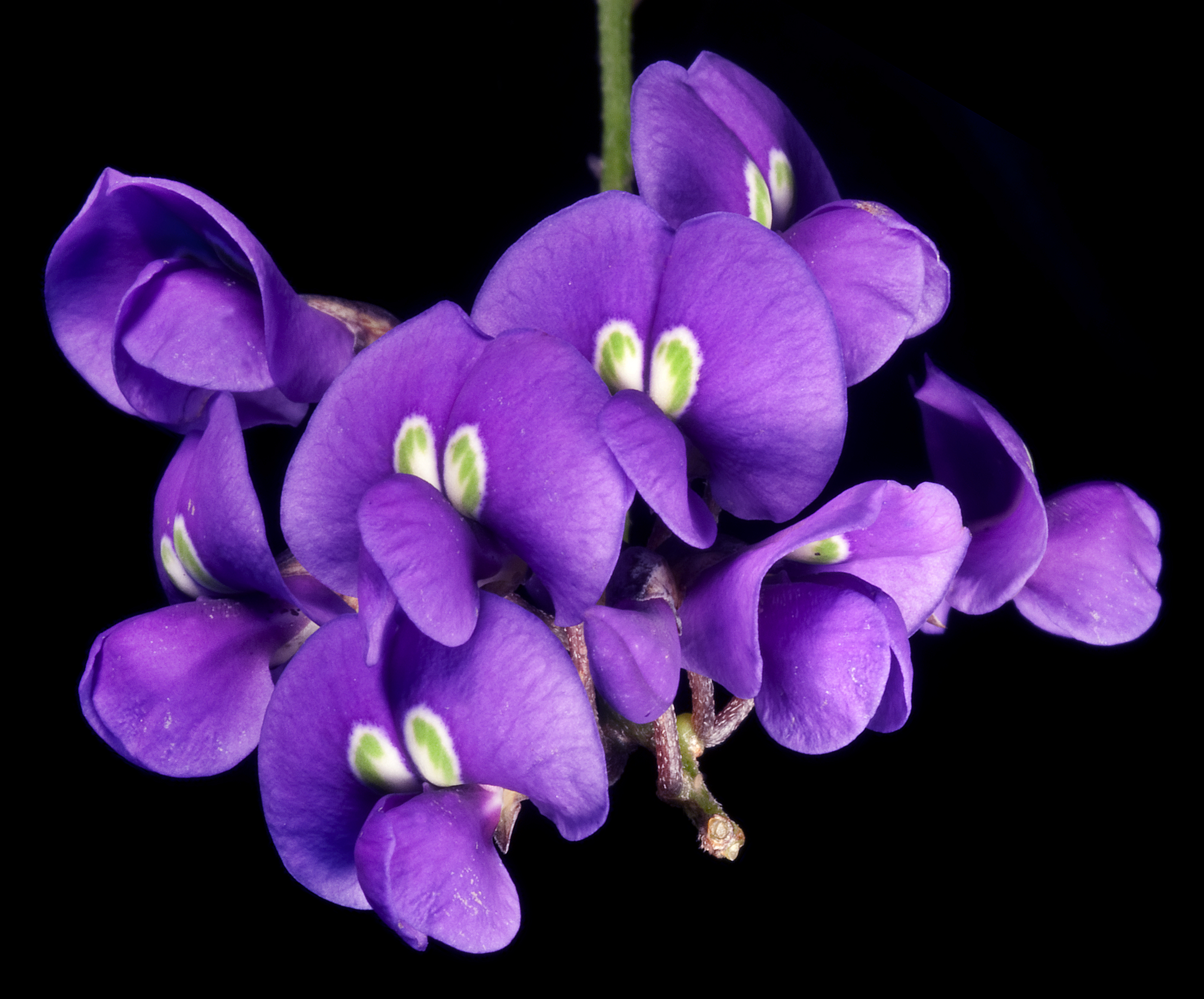

Scientific classification
- Kingdom: Plantae
- Clade: Tracheophytes
- Clade: Angiosperms
- Clade: Eudicots
- Clade: Rosids
- Order: Fabales
- Family: Fabaceae
- Subfamily: Faboideae
- Genus: Hardenbergia
- Species: H. comptoniana

Binomial name
- Hardenbergia comptoniana (Andrews) Benth.

Synonyms
- Caulinia comptoniana (Andrews) F.Muell.; Glycine comptoniana Andrews; Hardenbergia digitata Lindl.; Hardenbergia huegelii Benth.; Hardenbergia lindleyi Meisn.; Hardenbergia macrophylla (Lindl.) Benth.; Hardenbergia makoyana Lem.; Kennedia comptoniana (Andrews) Link; Kennedia macrophylla Lindl.; Kennedia makoyana (Lem.) Daveau

= Hardenbergia comptoniana =

Species of legume

Hardenbergia comptoniana is a species of flowering plant in the pea family, Fabaceae, native to Western Australia. It is known as native wisteria, a name also used for Austrocallerya megasperma. A twining vine, it produces purple flowers in the Southern Hemisphere spring. It is found on sand dunes and sand plains, and in open forest, on sand- or clay-based soils. It is readily cultivated in the garden, where it does best in a part-shaded position.

== Description ==
It is a vigorous twining vine with characteristically narrow trifoliate leaves, which distinguish it readily from its closest relative Hardenbergia violacea which has entire leaves.

The pea-shaped flowers appear from August to November (Southern Hemisphere late winter to spring) and can range in colour from mauve, to purple to dark blue, with pink and white forms also known. The two eye spots on the standard are white, in contrast to the light green-yellow spots on H. violacea. The flowers are arranged in drooping racemes. The flowers are followed by the development of the smooth grey-brown cylindrical seed pods. They are around 3.5 centimetres (1.4 in) long. The seed pods make an audible 'pop' when they release the seeds.

== Taxonomy ==
Henry Cranke Andrews described this species as Glycine comptoniana, naming it for the Lady Northampton as it was in her garden that a specimen had flowered; her surname was Compton. It was given its current name in 1837 by George Bentham.

Common names include native lilac, wild sarsaparilla and wild wisteria climber.

== Distribution and habitat ==
Hardenbergia comptoniana is found on the coastal plain from Geraldton to Albany in Western Australia, on sand dunes, limestone areas and sandplains. It also grows in forested areas further inland on both sand- and clay-based soils.

== Use in horticulture ==
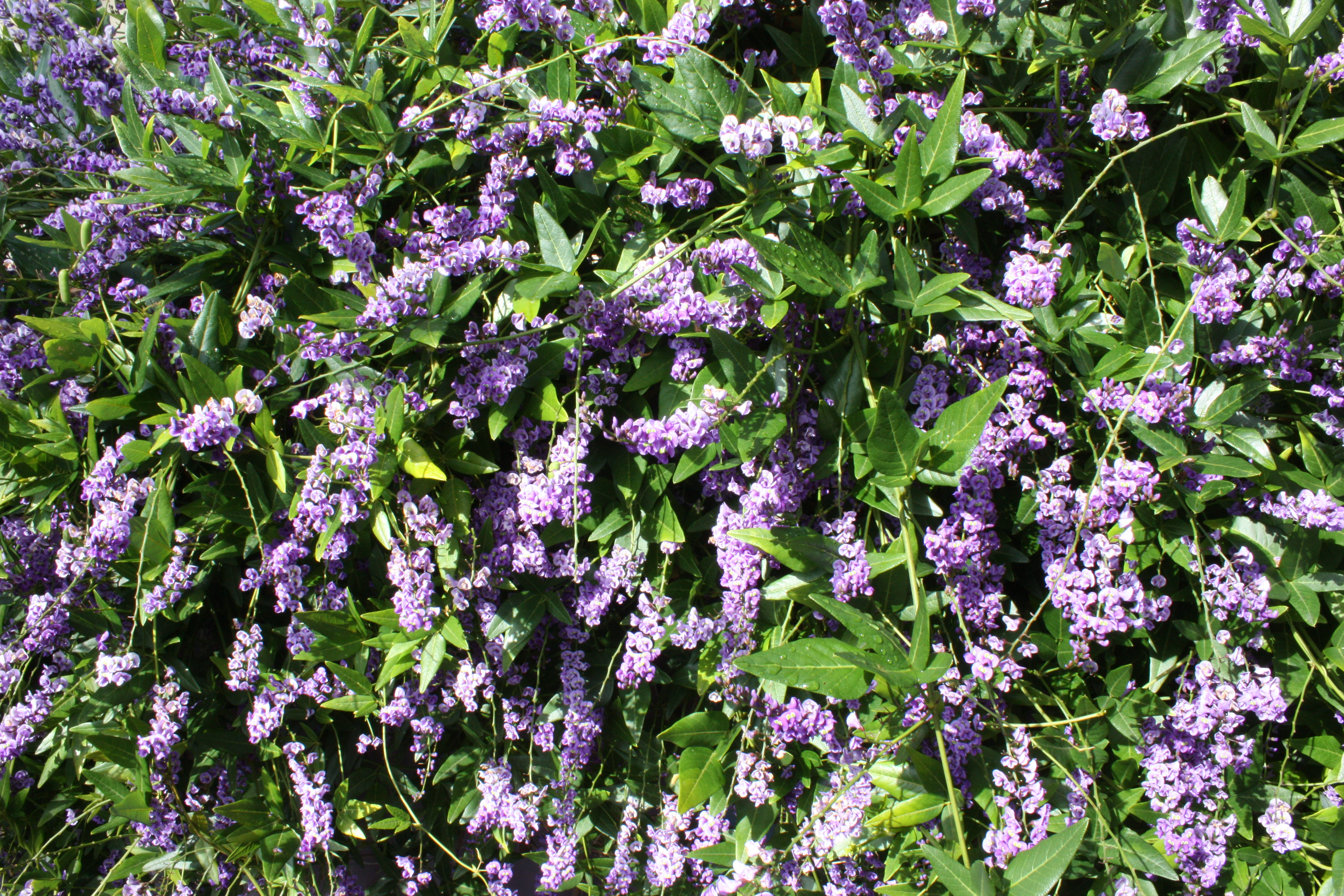
Growing on a trellis, Perth, Western Australia

H. comptoniana was brought into cultivation in England in 1810 by the 1st Marchioness of Northampton.

The plant is fairly vigorous and can cover a 3 by 3 metres (9.8 by 9.8 ft) area in two years, smothering smaller plants it is allowed to grow over. Partly shaded positions in the garden are most suitable. It is capable of growing high into surrounding trees or can cover fences or trellises rapidly, once established.

Seed propagation is straightforward, while cuttings can also be struck successfully.
