= Hardenbergia perbrevidens =

Scientific classification
- Kingdom: Plantae
- Clade: Tracheophytes
- Clade: Angiosperms
- Clade: Eudicots
- Clade: Rosids
- Order: Fabales
- Family: Fabaceae
- Subfamily: Faboideae
- Genus: Hardenbergia
- Species: H. perbrevidens

Binomial name
- Hardenbergia perbrevidens R.J.F.Hend.

Synonyms
- Caulina monophylla var. trifoliata F.Muell.; Hardenbergua bimaculata var. trifoliata (F.Muell.) Domin

Species of plant

Hardenbergia perbrevidens is a species of flowering plant in the family Fabaceae and is endemic to Queensland. It is a twiner with slender stems, trifoliate leaves with narrowly egg-shaped to narrowly elliptic leaflets, and racemes of deep mauve to purple flowers with yellow marks.

== Description ==
Hardenbergia perbrevidens is a slender, more or less glabrous twiner with trifoliate leaves on a petiole 15–35 mm (0.59–1.38 in) long, the leaflets narrowly egg-shaped to narrowly elliptic, 20–95 mm (0.79–3.74 in) long and 5–35 mm (0.20–1.38 in) wide. The flowers are arranged in racemes 30–200 mm (1.2–7.9 in) long with up to four flowers on a peduncle 8–5.5 mm (0.31–0.22 in) long, each on a pedicel 2–6 mm (0.079–0.236 in) long. The sepals are 3.5–4.0 mm (0.14–0.16 in) long and joined at the base, the upper two lobes fused and the lower three up to 0.6 mm (0.024 in) long. The petals are deep mauve to purple with yellow marks. Flowering occurs from June to September and the fruit is a pod 45–65 mm (1.8–2.6 in) long. This hardenbergia is similar to H. violacea, but that species has simple leaves.

== Taxonomy ==
Hardenbergia perbrevidens was first formally described in 1985 by Rodney John Francis Henderson in the journal Austrobaileya. The specific epithet (perbrevidens) refers to the short sepal lobes.

== Distribution and habitat ==
Hardenbergia perbrevidens is found in inland north-eastern Queensland where it grows in sandy soil.

== Conservation status ==
This species is listed as of "least concern" under the Queensland Government Nature Conservation Act 1992.
