= Porphyrosela alternata =

Scientific classification
- Kingdom: Animalia
- Phylum: Arthropoda
- Clade: Pancrustacea
- Class: Insecta
- Order: Lepidoptera
- Family: Gracillariidae
- Genus: Porphyrosela
- Species: P. alternata

Binomial name
- Porphyrosela alternata Kumata, 1993

Species of moth

Porphyrosela alternata is a moth of the family Gracillariidae. It is known from Japan (the island of Kyūshū), Malaysia (the states of Pahang and Selangor), Nepal and Taiwan. This species is a well-known pest of cotton.

The wingspan is 2.6-4.3 mm.

The larvae feed on Desmodium species, including Desmodium heterocarpon, Desmodium heterophyllum and Desmodium strigillosum. They mine the leaves of their host plant.
