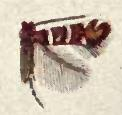

Scientific classification
- Domain: Eukaryota
- Kingdom: Animalia
- Phylum: Arthropoda
- Class: Insecta
- Order: Lepidoptera
- Family: Gracillariidae
- Genus: Porphyrosela
- Species: P. desmodiella

Binomial name
- Porphyrosela desmodiella (Clemens, 1859)

Synonyms
- Lithocolletis desmodiella Clemens, 1859; Porphyrosela gregariella (Murtfeldt, 1881)

= Porphyrosela desmodiella =

Species of insect

Porphyrosela desmodiella is a moth of the family Gracillariidae. It is known from Brazil, Cuba, the Virgin Islands (Saint Thomas), Canada (Ontario) and the United States (including Kentucky, Maryland, Missouri, South Carolina, North Carolina, Pennsylvania, Tennessee, Texas, Indiana, Florida, Connecticut, Georgia, Maine, New York, Vermont and Washington).

The wingspan is 4.5–5 mm.

The larvae feed on Bradburya species, Centrosema virginianum, Desmodium species (including Desmodium tortuosum and Desmodium viridiflorum), Lespedeza species (including Lespedeza bicolor, Lespedeza capitata and Lespedeza thunbergii), Phaseolus species, Strophostyles leiosperma and Trifolium repens. They mine the leaves of their host plant.
