= Porphyrosela gautengi =

Scientific classification
- Kingdom: Animalia
- Phylum: Arthropoda
- Class: Insecta
- Order: Lepidoptera
- Family: Gracillariidae
- Genus: Porphyrosela
- Species: P. gautengi

Binomial name
- Porphyrosela gautengi de Prins, 2012

Species of moth

Porphyrosela gautengi is a moth of the family Gracillariidae. It is found in South Africa in secondary forests.

The length of the forewings is 1.9–2.07 mm.
