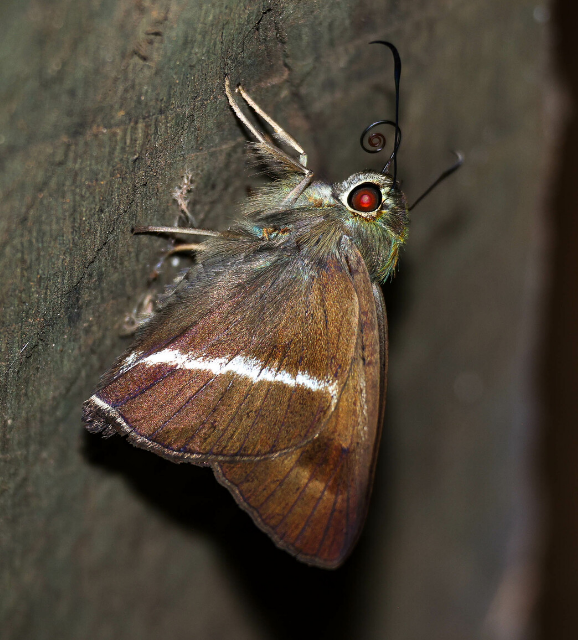

Scientific classification
- Kingdom: Animalia
- Phylum: Arthropoda
- Class: Insecta
- Order: Lepidoptera
- Family: Hesperiidae
- Genus: Hasora
- Species: H. khoda

Binomial name
- Hasora khoda (Mabille, 1876)

= Hasora khoda =

Large banded awl

Species of butterfly

Hasora khoda, the large banded awl, is a butterfly belonging to the family Hesperiidae which is found in India, parts of Southeast Asia and Australia.

== Description ==
It is a butterfly with the characteristic shape of the Hesperiidae, massive with wings positioned in a "V" and with a triangular profile.With a wingspan of approximately 44 mm, it is dark brown in colour for the male, lighter brown for the female with an ornamentation of small yellow spots in the central part of the forewings and on the underside of the hindwings a white line across The caterpillar is black with white longitudinal lines and white hairs.

== Range ==
The large banded awl is found in India in Assam (Cachar) and the Andaman Islands eastwards to Myanmar, Thailand, the Philippines, Sulawesi, New Caledonia and Australia.

The type locality is New Caledonia.

== Subspecies ==
- Hasora khoda khoda New Caledonia
- Hasora khoda coulteri Wood-Mason et de Nicéville, [1887] India, Burma Birmanie, Thaïland
- Hasora khoda dampierensis Rothschild, 1915 New Guinea
- Hasora khoda haslia Swinhoe, 1899 Australia
- Hasora khoda latalba de Jong, 1982
- Hasora khoda minsona Swinhoe, 1907 Borneo

== Status ==
Very rare in India.

== Host-plants ==
The larva has been recorded on Callerya megasperma and Wisteria sinensis.

== See also ==
- Coeliadinae
- Hesperiidae
- List of butterflies of India (Coeliadinae)
- List of butterflies of India (Hesperiidae)
