= Porphyrosela desmodivora =

Scientific classification
- Kingdom: Animalia
- Phylum: Arthropoda
- Class: Insecta
- Order: Lepidoptera
- Family: Gracillariidae
- Genus: Porphyrosela
- Species: P. desmodivora

Binomial name
- Porphyrosela desmodivora de Prins, 2012

Species of moth

Porphyrosela desmodivora is a moth of the family Gracillariidae. It is found in western Cameroon.

The length of the forewings is 1.15–1.45 mm.
