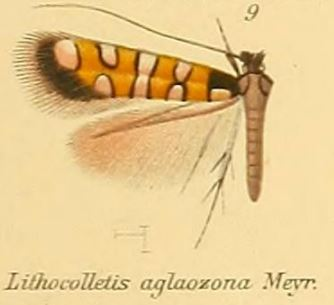

Scientific classification
- Domain: Eukaryota
- Kingdom: Animalia
- Phylum: Arthropoda
- Class: Insecta
- Order: Lepidoptera
- Family: Gracillariidae
- Genus: Porphyrosela
- Species: P. aglaozona

Binomial name
- Porphyrosela aglaozona (Meyrick, 1882)

Synonyms
- Lithocolletis aglaozona Meyrick, 1882; Porphyrosela agaozoma (Neale, 1995)

= Porphyrosela aglaozona =

Species of moth

Porphyrosela aglaozona is a moth of the family Gracillariidae. It is known in Australia in the states of New South Wales, Queensland and Victoria and on Fiji.

The larvae feed on Desmodium, Glycine, Kennedia (including Kennedia rubicunda) and Phaseolus species (including Phaseolus atropurpureus, Phaseolus vulgaris and Pueraria montana). They mine the leaves of their host plant. The mine has the a tentiform shape.
