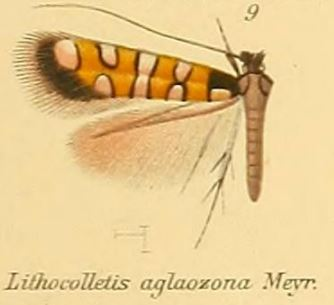
- Porphyrosela aglaozona (Meyrick, 1882)

Scientific classification
- Domain: Eukaryota
- Kingdom: Animalia
- Phylum: Arthropoda
- Class: Insecta
- Order: Lepidoptera
- Family: Gracillariidae
- Subfamily: Lithocolletinae
- Genus: Porphyrosela; Braun, 1908

Species
- See text

= Porphyrosela =

Genus of moths

Porphyrosela is a genus of moths in the family Gracillariidae.

== Species ==
- Porphyrosela aglaozona (Meyrick, 1883)
- Porphyrosela alternata Kumata, 1993
- Porphyrosela desmodiella (Clemens, 1859)
- Porphyrosela desmodivora de Prins, 2012
- Porphyrosela dismochrysa (Lower, 1897)
- Porphyrosela dorinda (Meyrick, 1912)
- Porphyrosela gautengi de Prins, 2012
- Porphyrosela hardenbergiella (Wise, 1957)
- Porphyrosela homotropha Vári, 1963
- Porphyrosela minuta Clarke, 1953
- Porphyrosela neodoxa (Meyrick, 1916)
- Porphyrosela teramni Vári, 1961
