= Porphyrosela homotropha =

Scientific classification
- Kingdom: Animalia
- Phylum: Arthropoda
- Class: Insecta
- Order: Lepidoptera
- Family: Gracillariidae
- Genus: Porphyrosela
- Species: P. homotropha

Binomial name
- Porphyrosela homotropha Vári, 1963

Species of moth

Porphyrosela homotropha is a moth of the family Gracillariidae. It is known from Ethiopia.

The length of the forewings is 1.45 mm. Adults are on wing from November to January.

The larvae feed on Glycine max and Vigna species. They mine the leaves of their host plant.
