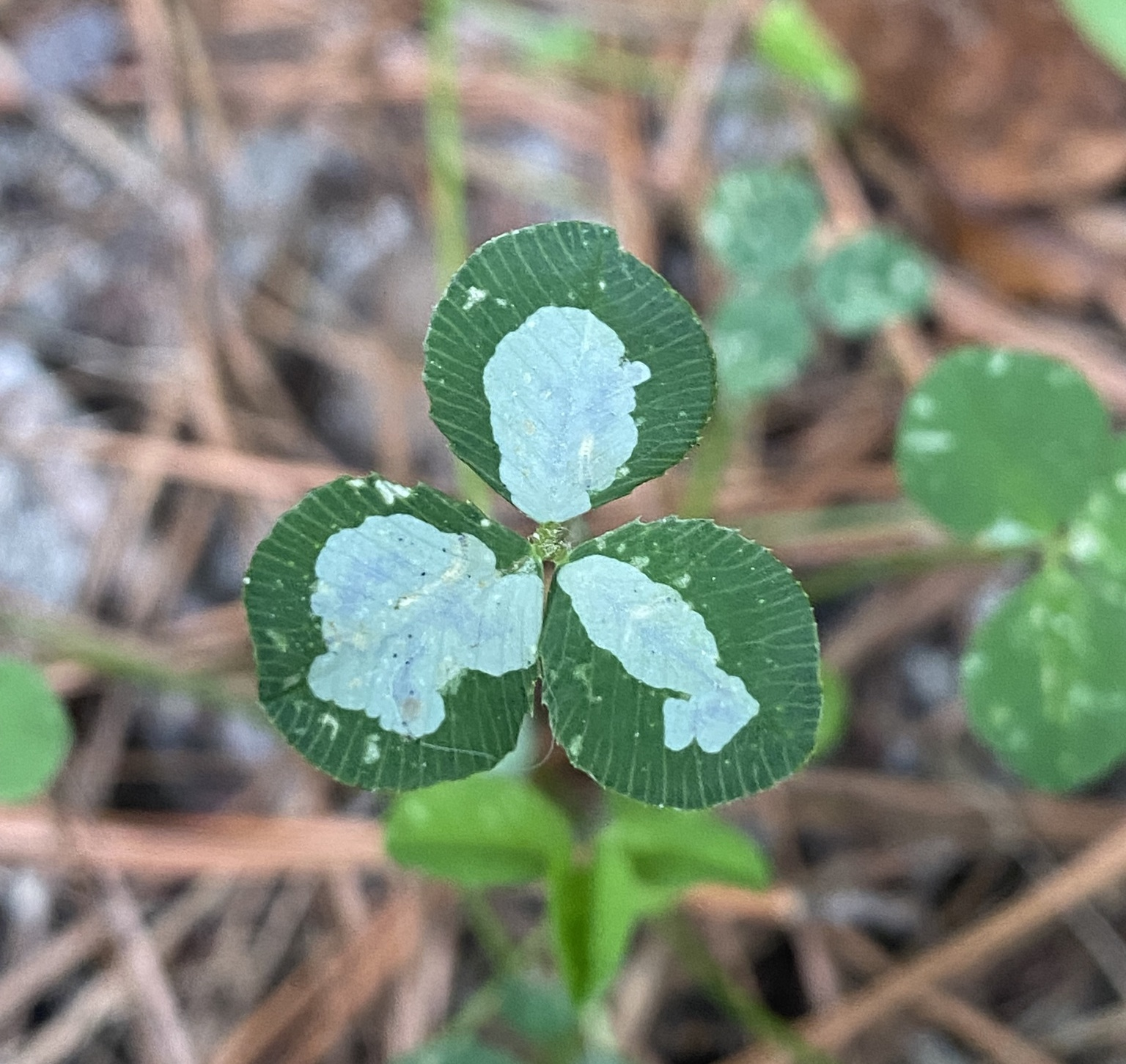
- Larvae in leaf mines on White Clover

Scientific classification
- Kingdom: Animalia
- Phylum: Arthropoda
- Class: Insecta
- Order: Lepidoptera
- Family: Gracillariidae
- Genus: Porphyrosela
- Species: P. minuta

Binomial name
- Porphyrosela minuta Clarke, 1953

= Porphyrosela minuta =

Species of moth

Porphyrosela minuta is a moth of the family Gracillariidae. It is known from Argentina, Brazil and Chile. It has been recently introduced in North America and is found in several states, as far north as Maryland.

The larvae feed on Medicago sativa and Trifolium species (including Trifolium pratense). They mine the leaves of their host plant.

== Links ==
Bugguide. Info and images
