= Porphyrosela teramni =

Scientific classification
- Kingdom: Animalia
- Phylum: Arthropoda
- Class: Insecta
- Order: Lepidoptera
- Family: Gracillariidae
- Genus: Porphyrosela
- Species: P. teramni

Binomial name
- Porphyrosela teramni Vári, 1961

Species of moth

Porphyrosela teramni is a moth of the family Gracillariidae. It is known from South Africa and Zimbabwe.

The length of the forewings is 2.09–2.18 mm. Adults are on wing from early November to mid-May.
