= Porphyrosela neodoxa =

Scientific classification
- Kingdom: Animalia
- Phylum: Arthropoda
- Class: Insecta
- Order: Lepidoptera
- Family: Gracillariidae
- Genus: Porphyrosela
- Species: P. neodoxa

Binomial name
- Porphyrosela neodoxa (Meyrick, 1916)

Synonyms
- Lithocolletis neodoxa Meyrick, 1916

Species of moth

Porphyrosela neodoxa is a moth of the family Gracillariidae. It is known from Bihar, India.

The larvae feed on Cajanus cajan, Cajanus indicus, Desmodium, Rhynchosia species (including Rhynchosia minima). They probably mine the leaves of their host plant.
