= Porphyrosela dorinda =

Scientific classification
- Domain: Eukaryota
- Kingdom: Animalia
- Phylum: Arthropoda
- Class: Insecta
- Order: Lepidoptera
- Family: Gracillariidae
- Genus: Porphyrosela
- Species: P. dorinda

Binomial name
- Porphyrosela dorinda (Meyrick, 1912)

Synonyms
- Lithocolletis dorinda Meyrick, 1912

Species of moth

Porphyrosela dorinda is a moth of the family Gracillariidae. It is known from Hong Kong, India (Uttar Pradesh, Bihar, West Bengal), Japan (Ryukyu Islands), Malaysia, the Philippines (Mindoro and Luzon) and Taiwan.

The wingspan is 3–4.1 mm.

The larvae feed on Calopogonium, Desmodium species (including Desmodium gangeticum, Desmodium heterocarpon, Desmodium heterophyllum and Desmodium triflorum), Pueraria montana, Uraria lagopus and Uraria neglecta. They mine the leaves of their host plant.
