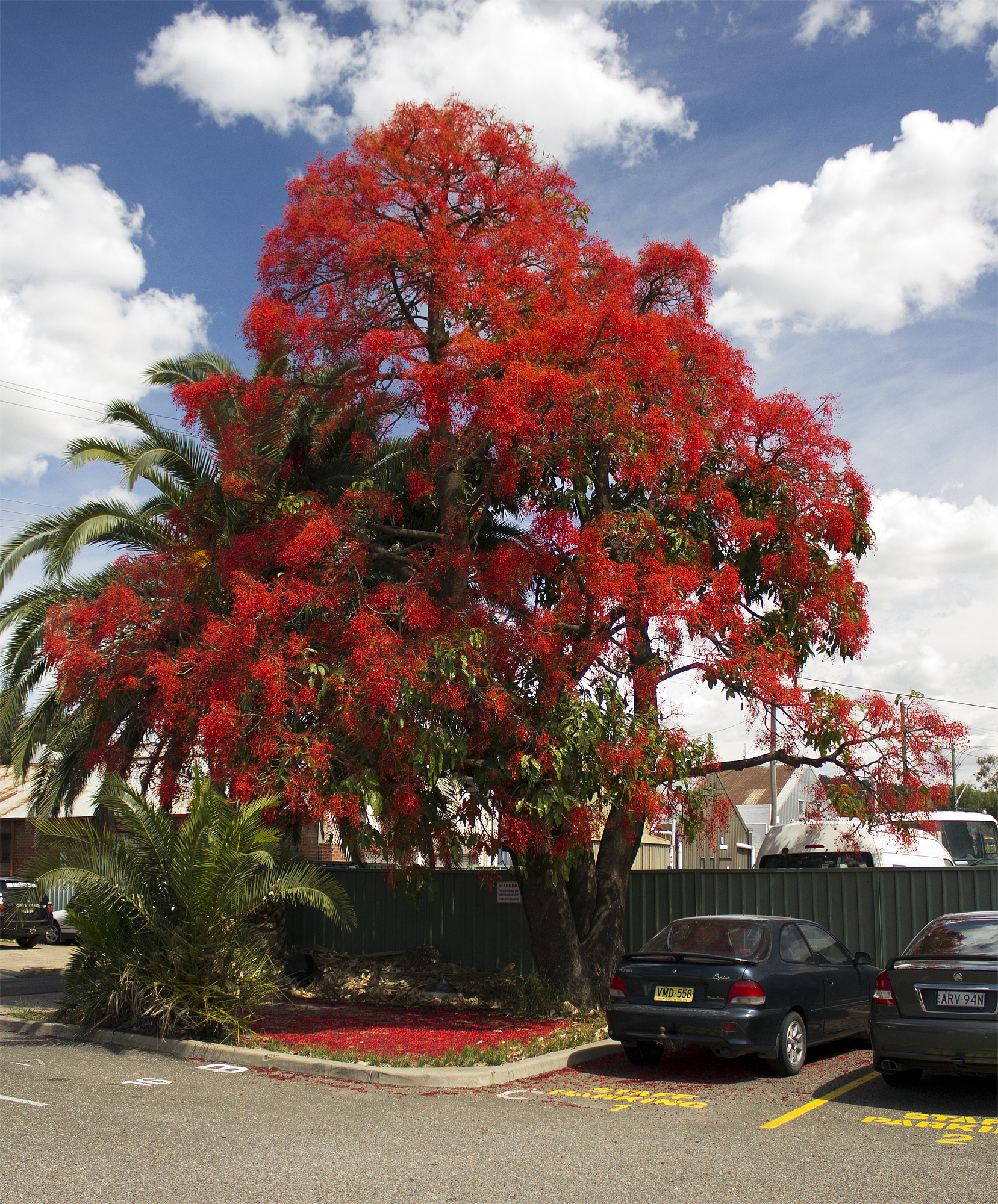
- In full flower at Wagga Wagga, New South Wales

Conservation status
- Least Concern (NCA)

Scientific classification
- Kingdom: Plantae
- Clade: Embryophytes
- Clade: Tracheophytes
- Clade: Spermatophytes
- Clade: Angiosperms
- Clade: Eudicots
- Clade: Rosids
- Order: Malvales
- Family: Malvaceae
- Genus: Brachychiton
- Species: B. acerifolius

Binomial name
- Brachychiton acerifolius (A.Cunn. ex G.Don) F.Muell.

Synonyms
- Brachychiton acerifolius Macarthur & C.Moore; Brachychiton acerifolius var. typicum Terrac.; Clompanus acerifolia (G.Don) Kuntze; Sterculia acerifolia A.Cunn. ex G.Don

= Brachychiton acerifolius =

Species of flowering plant

Brachychiton acerifolius is a large tree of the family Malvaceae endemic to tropical and subtropical regions on the east coast of Australia. It is famous for the bright red bell-shaped flowers that often cover the whole tree when it is leafless. It is commonly known as the flame tree, Illawarra flame tree, lacebark tree, or (along with other members of the genus) kurrajong.

== Description ==
This species is a large deciduous tree, which forms a pyramidal habit. It may reach 30 to 35 m (98 to 115 ft) in height in its natural habitat, but is usually shorter in cultivation. The trunk is smoothly cylindrical and green or grey-green in colour, often tapering unbranched to the very tip of the tree. Leaves have long petioles and measure up to 30 cm (12 in) x 25 cm (9.8 in). They are glossy green, glabrous, simple, alternate, and highly variable in shape—they may be entire and ovate or up to 5-lobed.

Flowers are bright red or scarlet in colour, bell-shaped when viewed from the side and star-shaped when viewed end-on, about 25 to 30 mm (1.0 to 1.2 in) long by 16 to 22 mm (0.6 to 0.9 in) wide, and are produced on large panicles. They have five petals, fused at the base and free at the ends. The ensuing fruits are a dehiscent pod which is dark brown, leathery, boat-shaped and about 10 cm (3.9 in) long. They ripen around May to August in Australia, splitting along one side to reveal two rows of yellow seeds numbering 12–26, each around 10 by 5 mm (0.4 by 0.2 in) and surrounded by a papery aril covered in stiff hairs, which are very irritating if touched.

== Distribution and habitat ==
Brachychiton acerifolius is found in well developed coastal rainforests from southern New South Wales to far north Queensland. In Cape York Peninsula and northeast Queensland the altitudinal range is from sea level to 1,000 m (3,300 ft). It also grows in drier, more seasonal forests.

== Cultivation and uses ==
B. acerifolius is very popular as an ornamental tree both in its native Australia and around the world. The flowering is a spectacular event, as it sheds its leaves just prior to producing masses of bright scarlet flowers over the entire tree. It is used for street plantings, public parks and gardens, and in private gardens. It is easily grown and may be propagated from seed, cuttings, or by grafting.

In the New South Wales local government area of Northern Beaches, the Illawarra flame tree is included in a list of trees that are exempt from the need to request Council's consent prior to removal.

The seeds of Brachychiton species are edible—Indigenous Australians ate them either raw or roasted after removing the irritating hairs that surround them in the pod. They are nutritious, containing 18% protein and 25% fat with high levels of zinc and magnesium. They also ate the roots of young trees.

== Ecology ==
This species is a host plant for the larvae of the pencilled blue, shining pencil-blue, common aeroplane and tailed emperor butterflies. The seeds are eaten by Australian king parrots and the regent and satin bowerbirds.

== Taxonomy ==
The genus Brachychiton was traditionally placed in the family Sterculiaceae, but that family, along with Bombacaceae and Tiliaceae, has been found to be polyphyletic and is now sunk into a more broadly defined Malvaceae.

Brachychiton acerifolius was first described in 1855 by W. Macarthur and C. Moore. It is sometimes spelled as Brachychiton acerifolium, under the assumption that the genus name Brachychiton is (Greek) neuter. In fact, Brachychiton is masculine (it is a bahuvrihi, and its first component is the descriptive component), and hence the correct species epithet is acerifolius. The name Brachychiton is derived from the Greek brachys meaning 'short' and chiton 'tunic', as a reference to the coating on the seed. The specific epithet acerifolius suggests the appearance of the foliage is similar to that of the genus Acer, the maples.

In his landmark Flora Australiensis, English botanist George Bentham published the first key for the nine described species of Brachychiton, and relegated them to a section of Sterculia. Hence the Illawarra flame tree became Sterculia acerifolia. Von Mueller maintained his recognition of Brachychiton as a separate genus. German botanist Otto Kuntze challenged the generic name Sterculia in 1891, on the grounds that the name Clompanus took precedence. He republished the Illawarra flame tree as Clompanus Haenkeana.

== Gallery ==
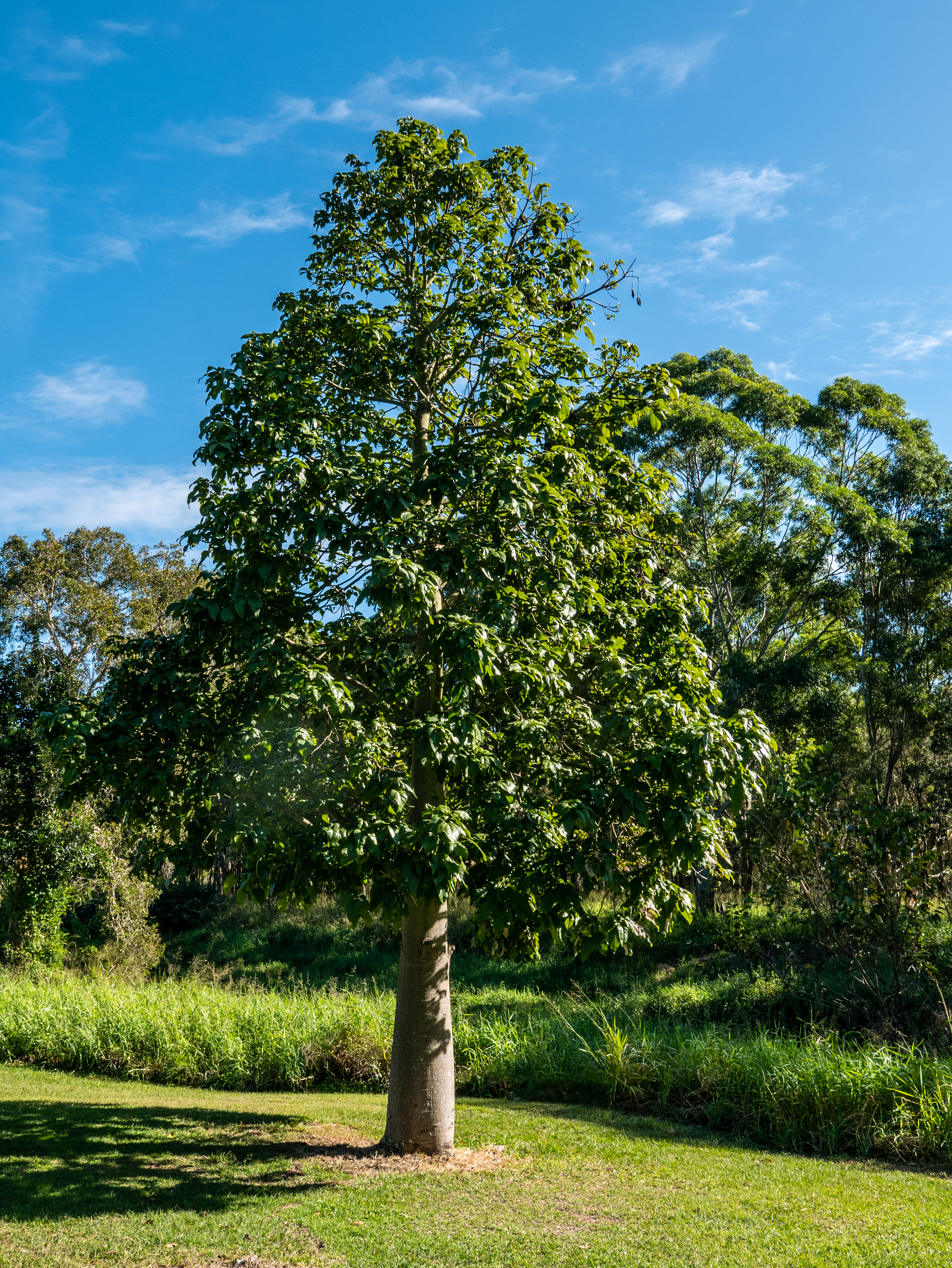
Whole tree, showing the conical habit and the tapering trunk

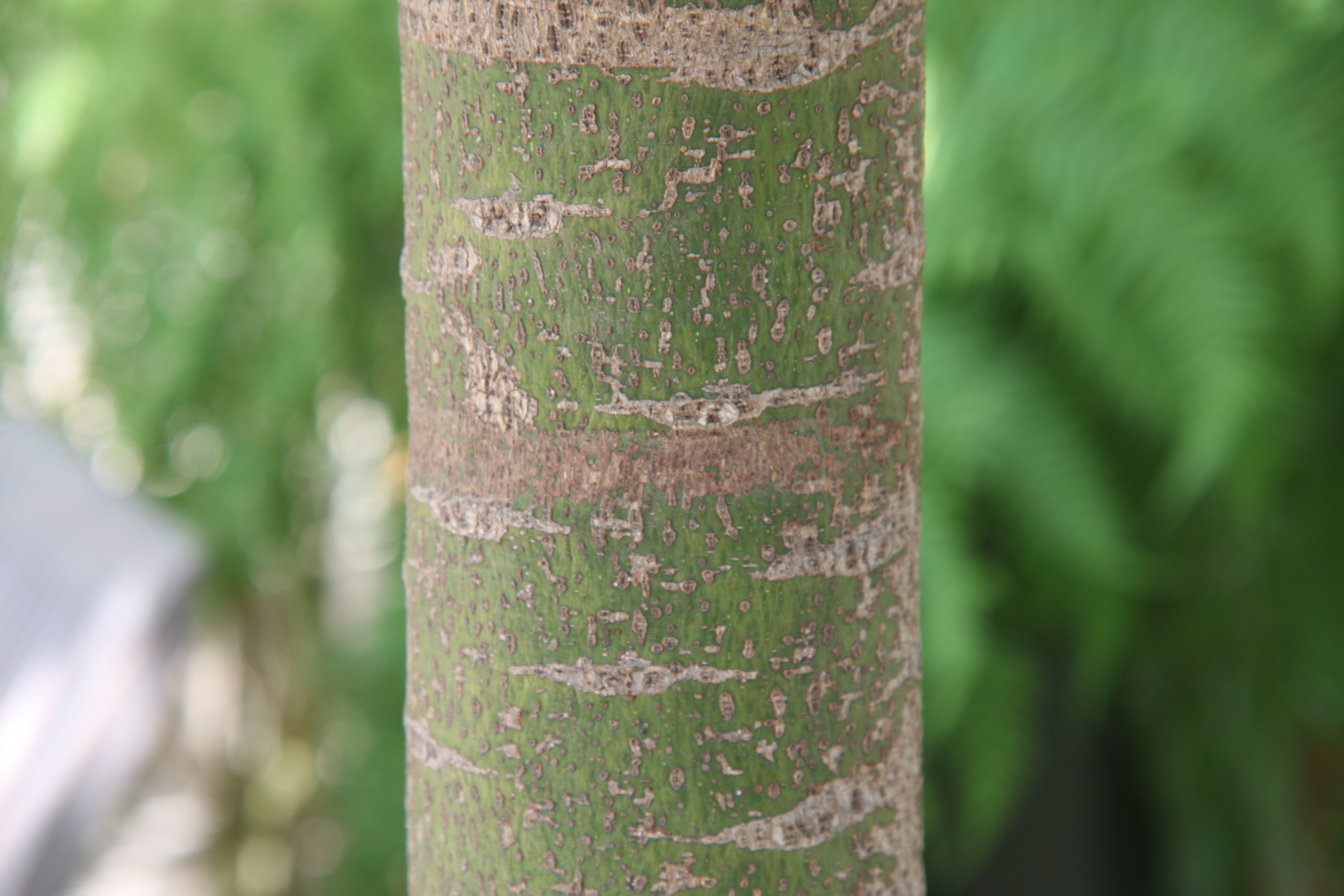
Trunk of a young tree

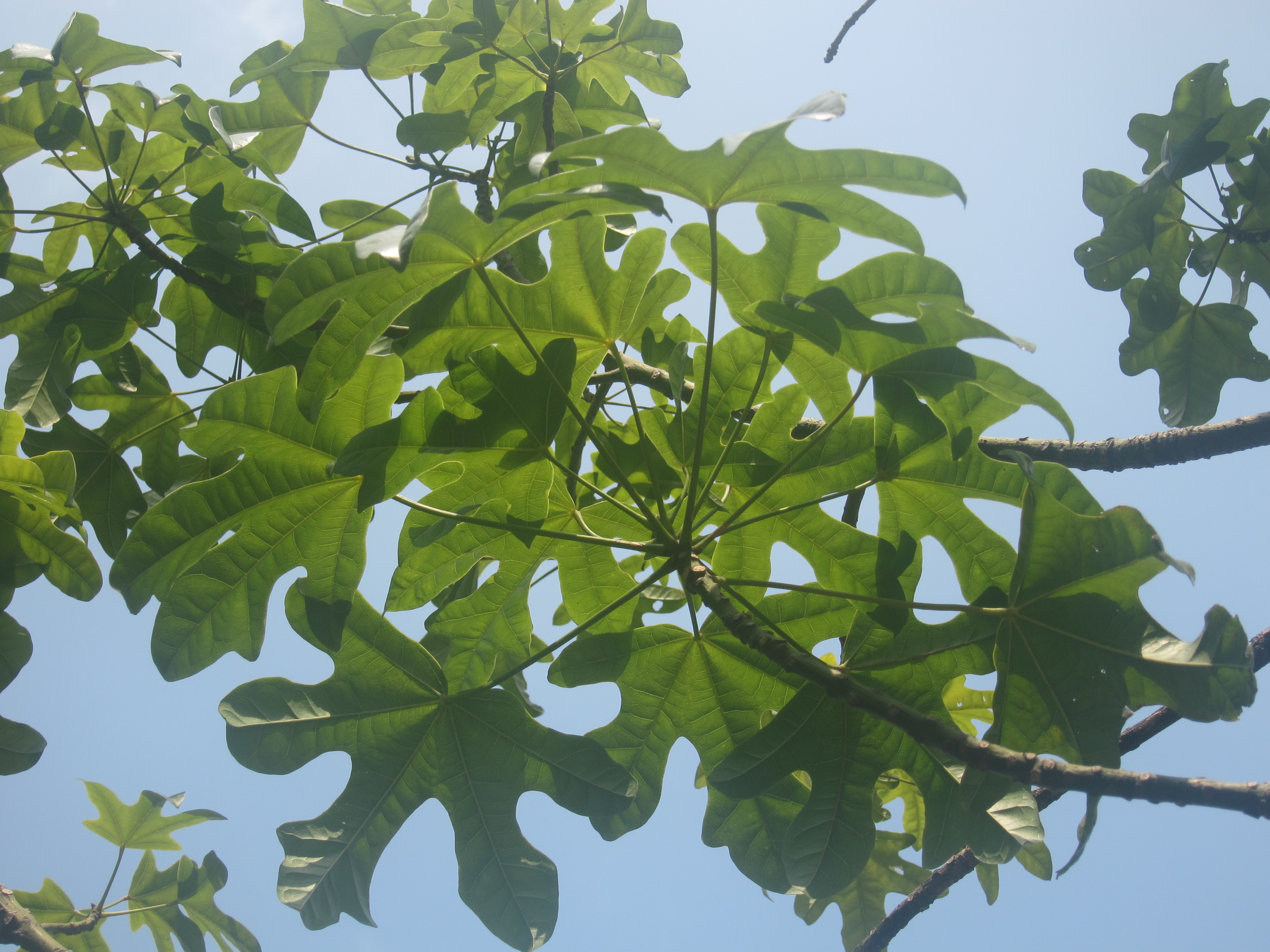
Foliage

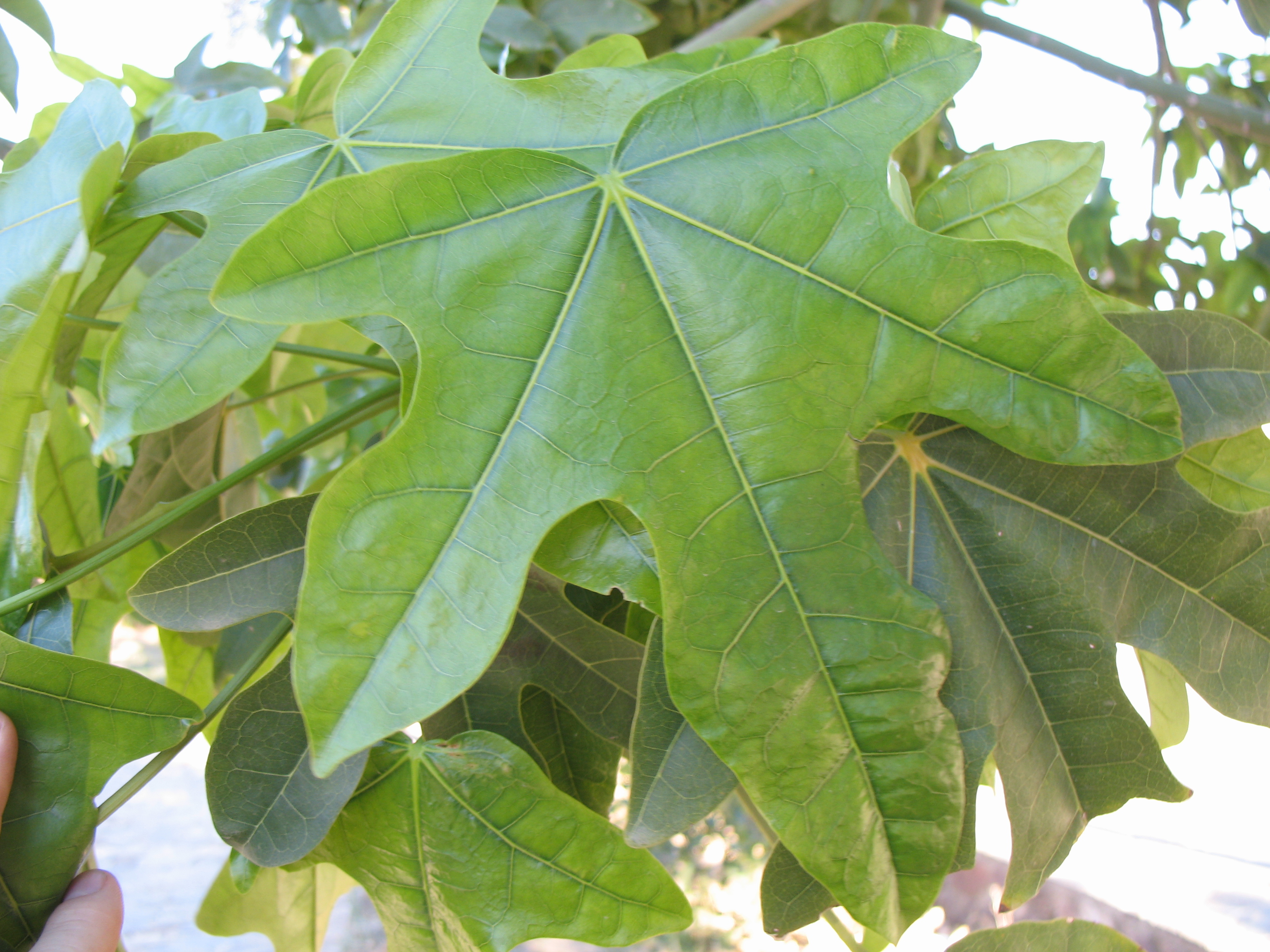
Leaf with 5 lobes

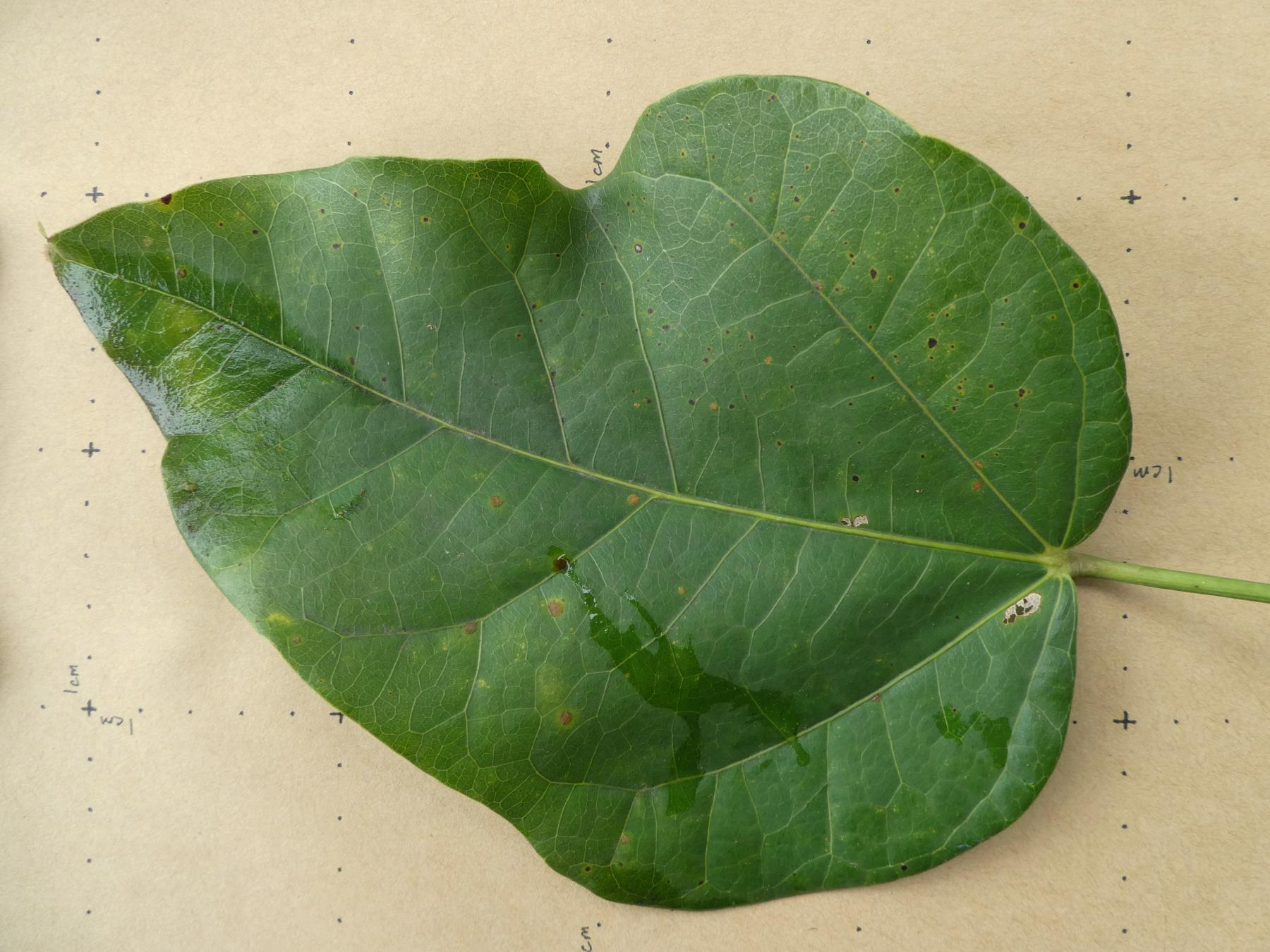
Leaf with very slight lobing

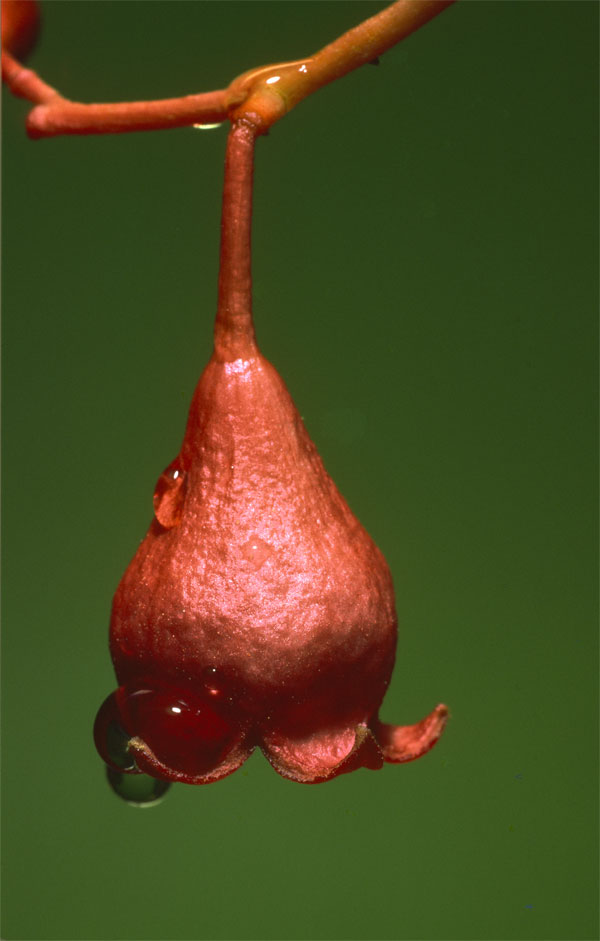
Close-up of flower

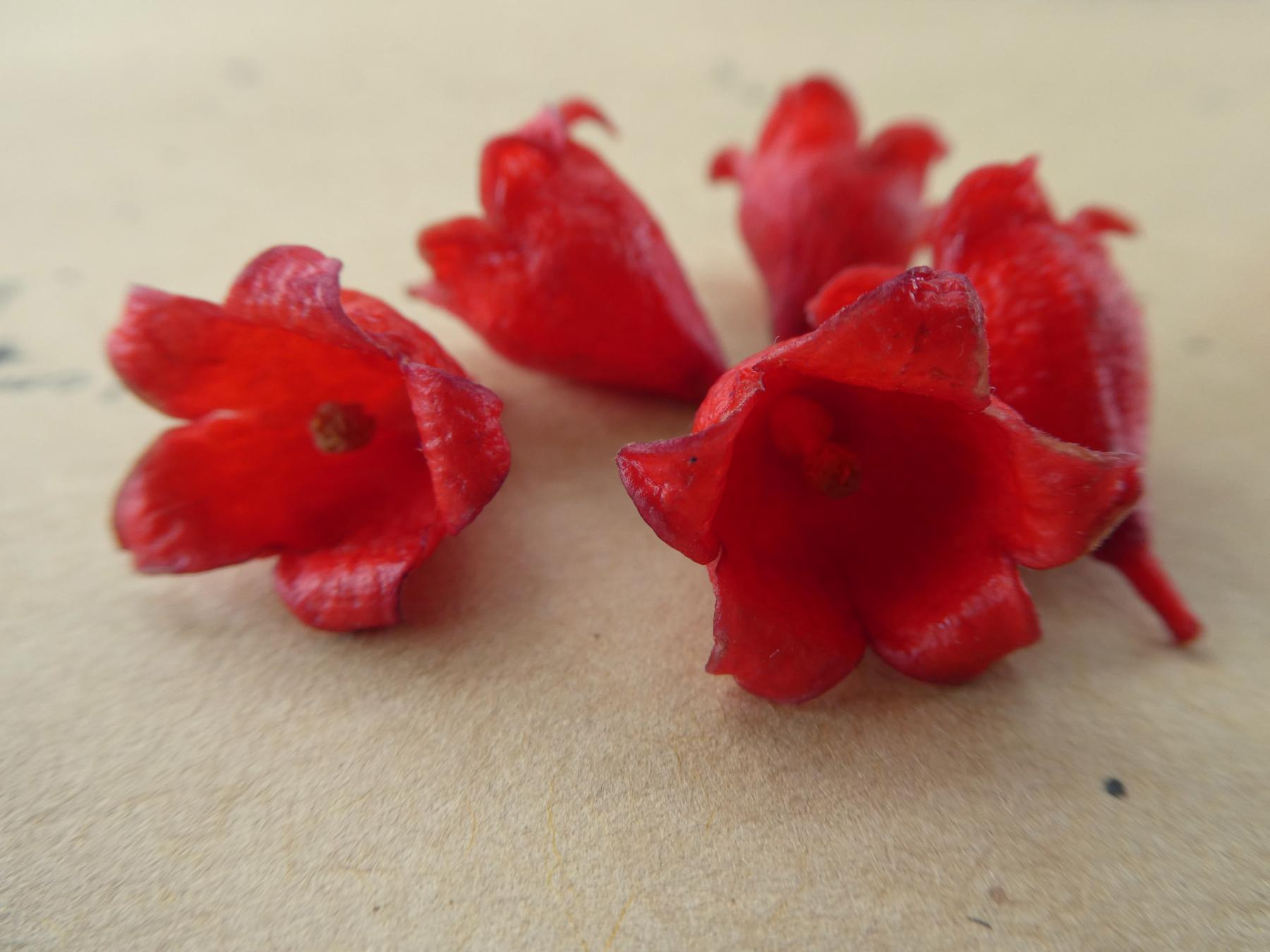
Collected flowers

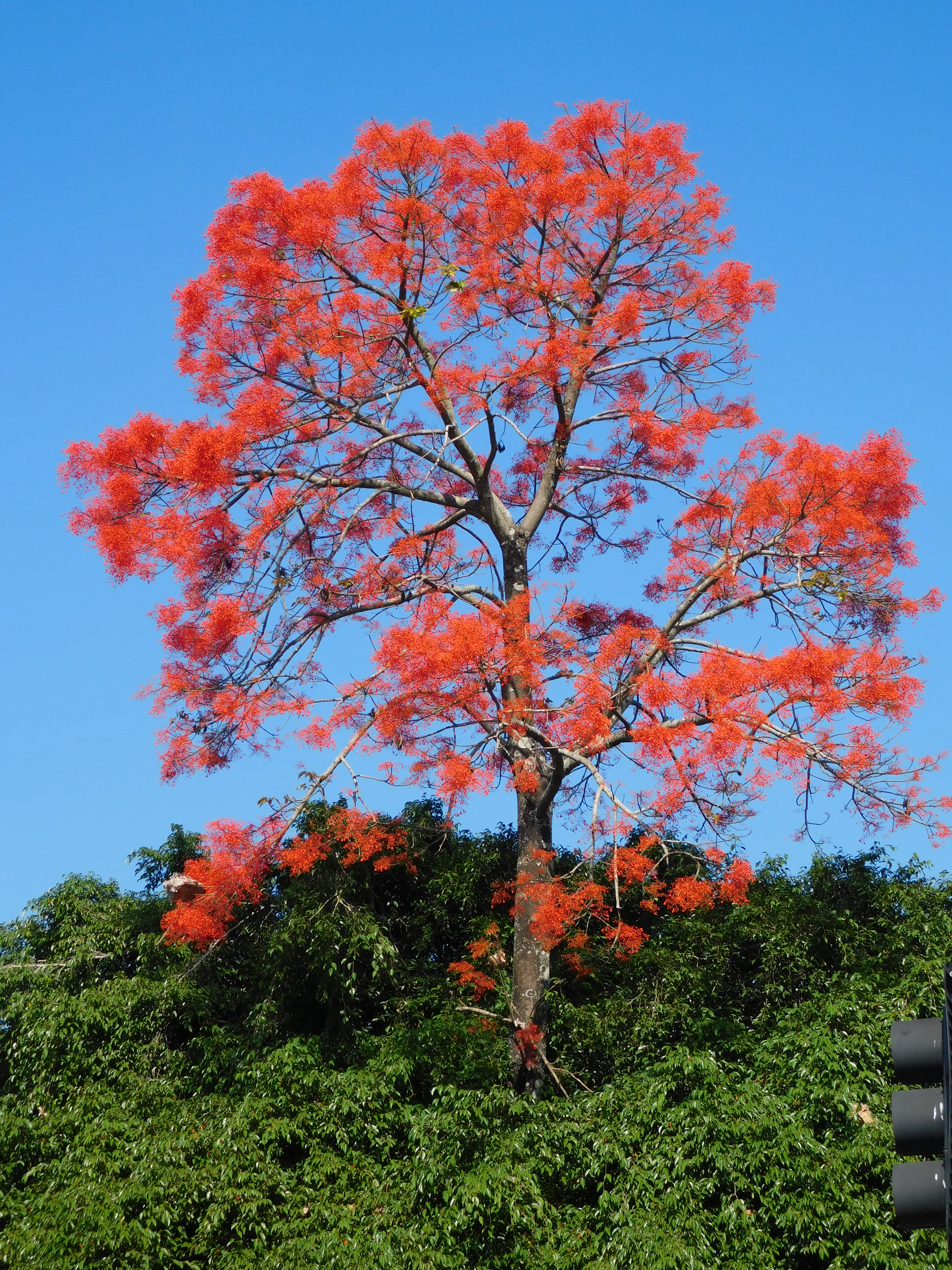
Flame Tree in full flower at Edge Hill State School, Queensland

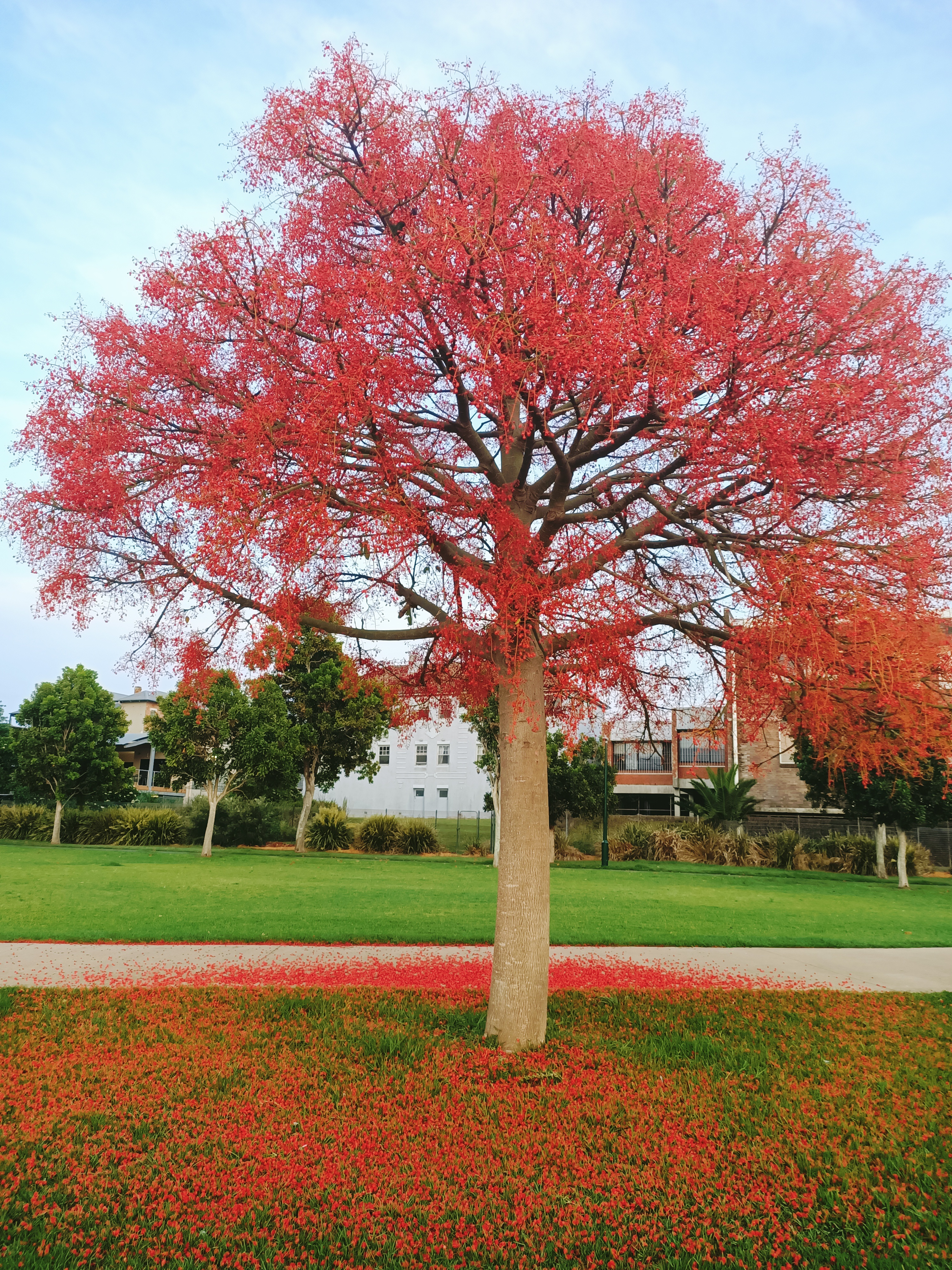
Blooming in spring with vibrant red petals scattered across the green grass below.

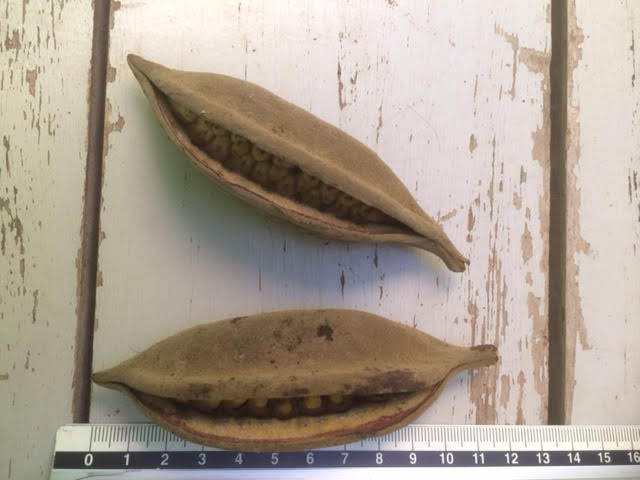
Seed pods

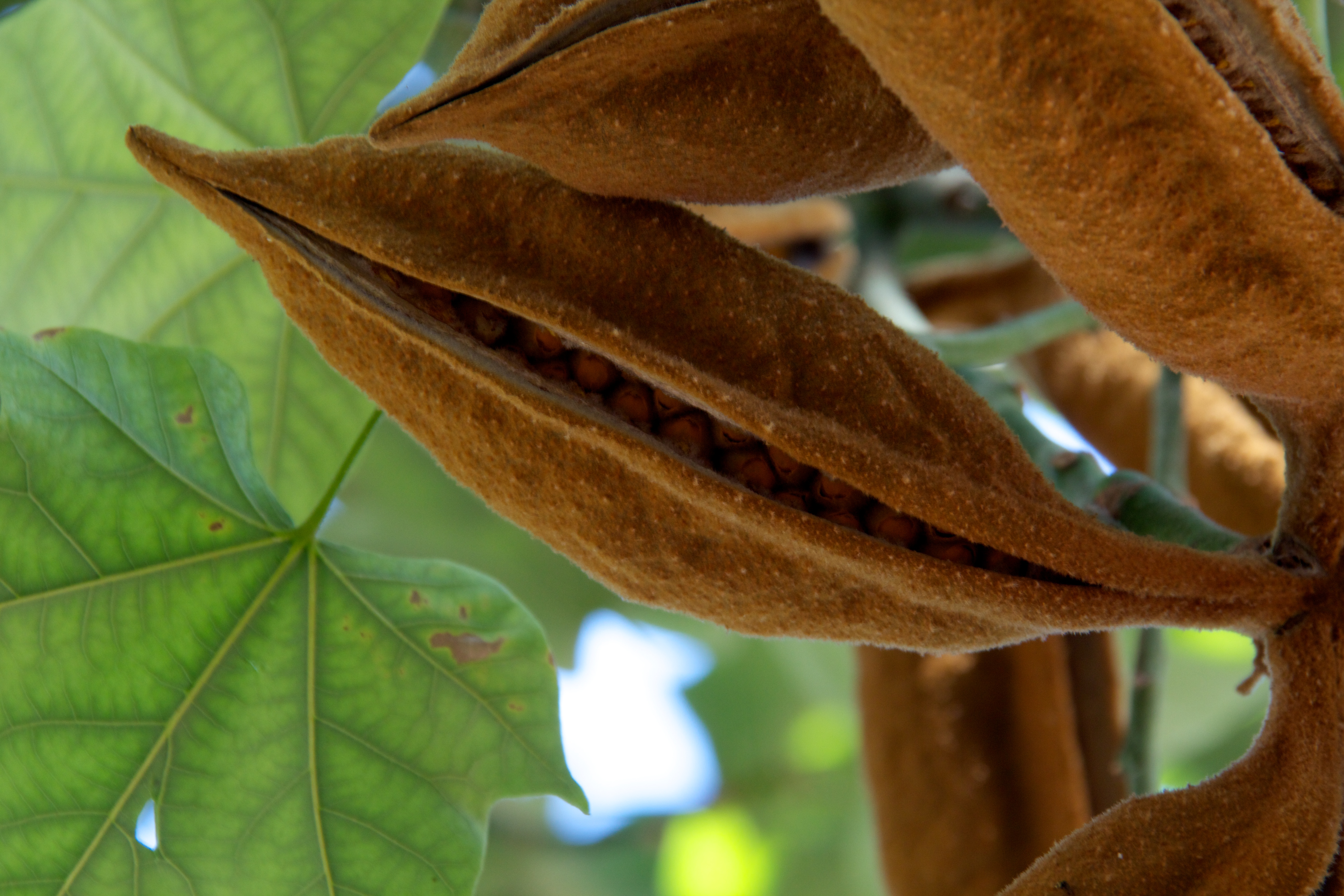
Seed pods

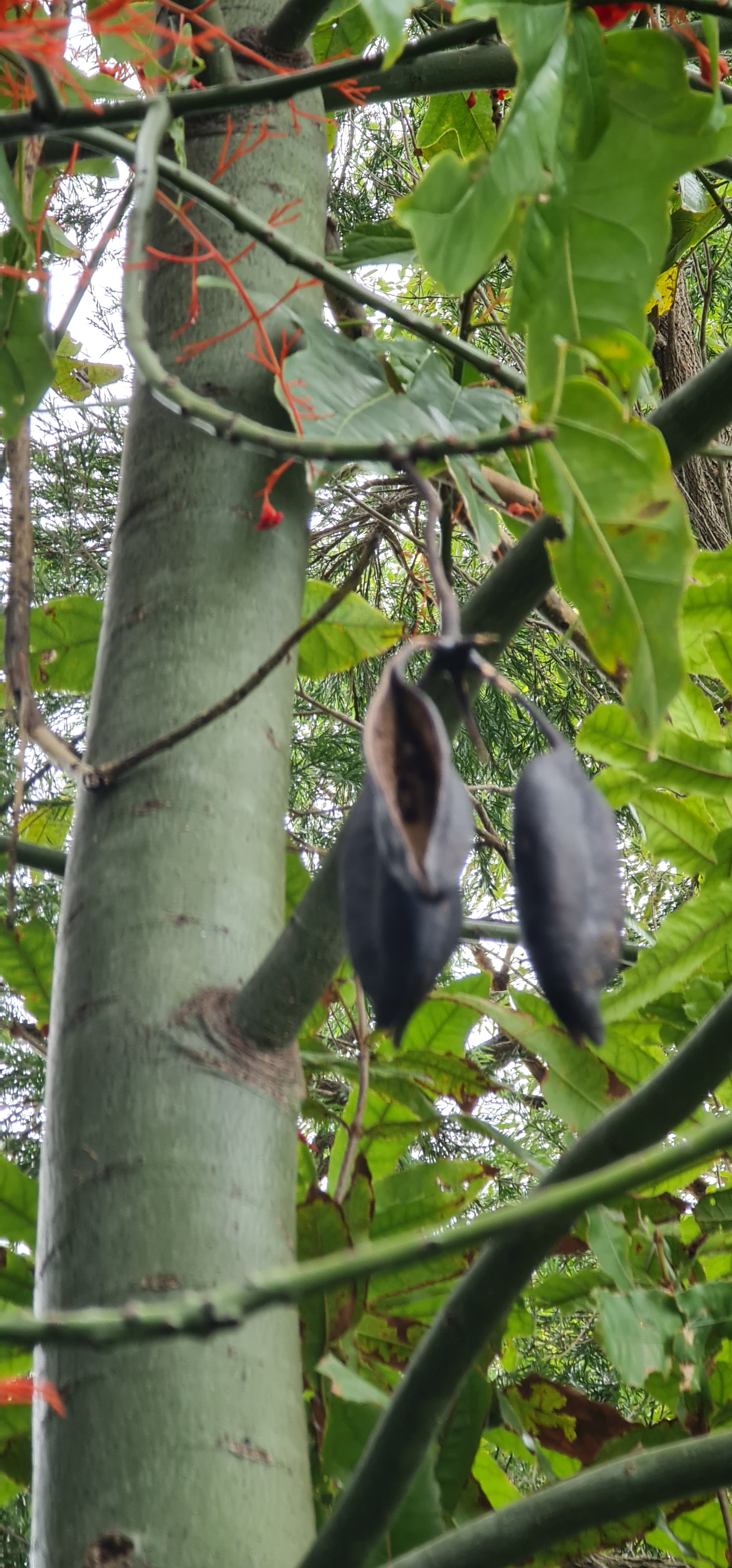
Empty seed pods on tree

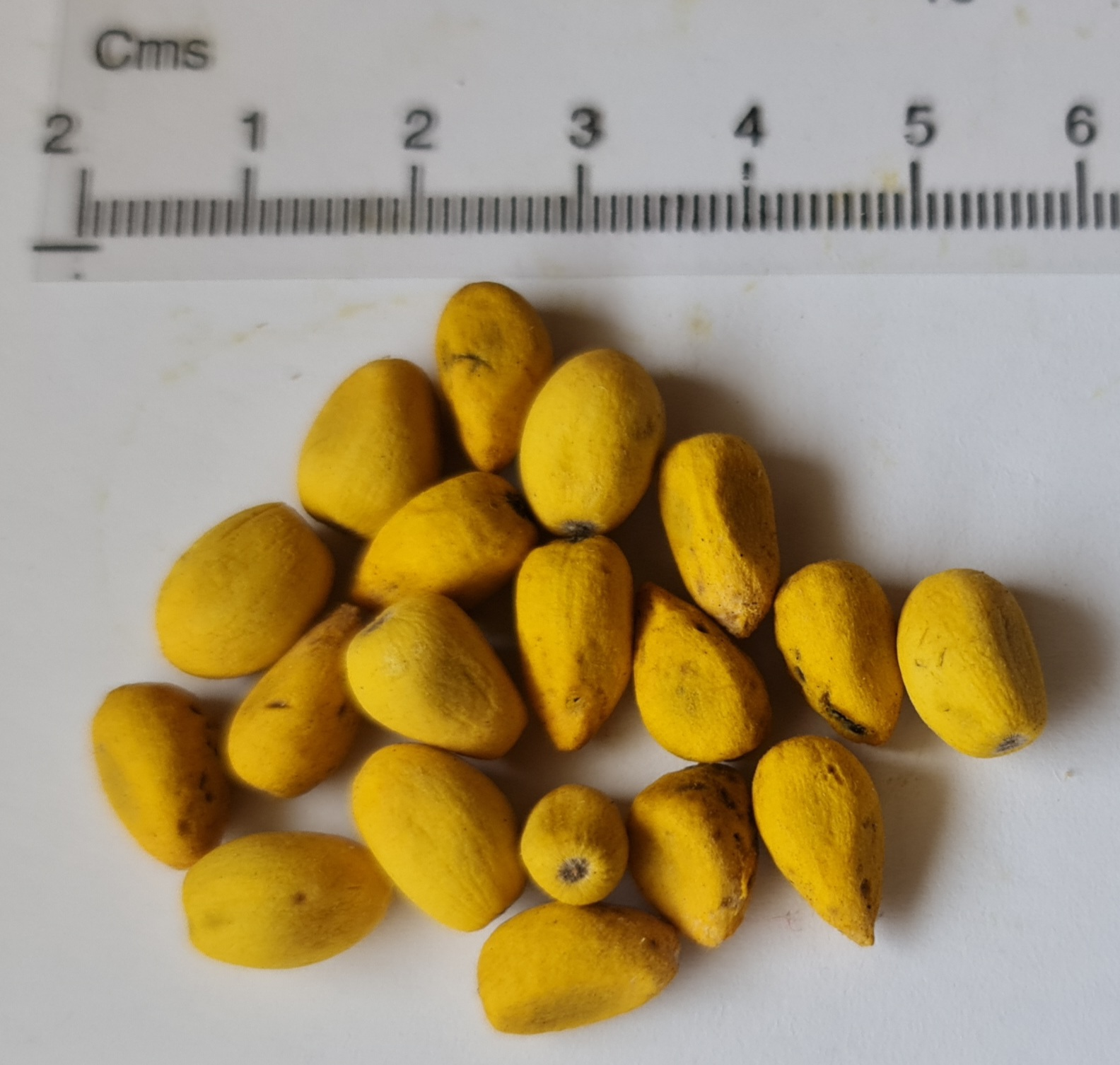
Seeds removed from pod
