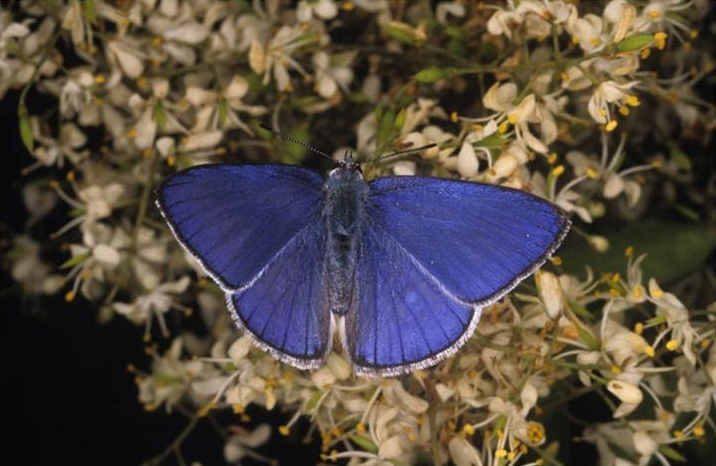
- Male
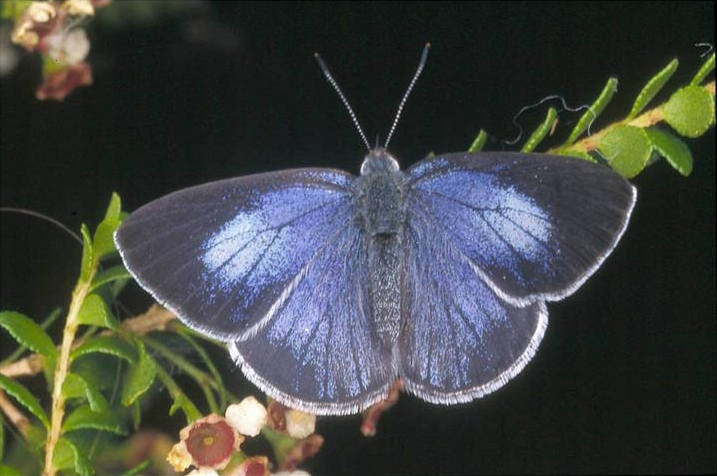
- Female

Scientific classification
- Domain: Eukaryota
- Kingdom: Animalia
- Phylum: Arthropoda
- Class: Insecta
- Order: Lepidoptera
- Family: Lycaenidae
- Genus: Candalides
- Species: C. absimilis

Binomial name
- Candalides absimilis (C. Felder, 1862)

Synonyms
- Holochila absimilis C. Felder, 1862; Candalides persimilis Waterhouse, 1942; Holochila persimilis; Erina persimilis

= Candalides absimilis =

Species of butterfly

Candalides absimilis, the pencilled blue or common pencil-blue, is a species of butterfly of the family Lycaenidae. It is found along the east coast of Australia, including Queensland, the Australian Capital Territory, New South Wales and Victoria.

The wingspan is about 30 mm.

The larvae have been recorded feeding on buds and young shoots of a wide range of plants, including Flagellaria, Macadamia integrifolia, Castanospermum australe, Erythrina, Callerya megasperma, Wisteria, Cassia fistula, Alectryon coriaceus, Brachychiton acerifolius and Cupaniopsis.

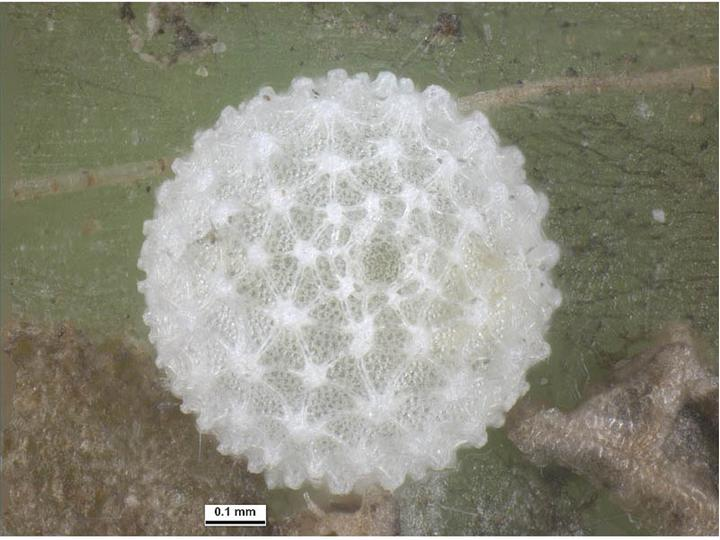
Egg

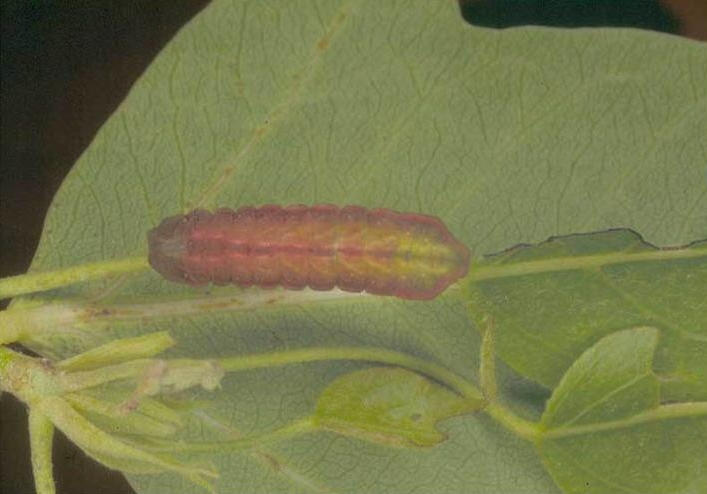
Larva

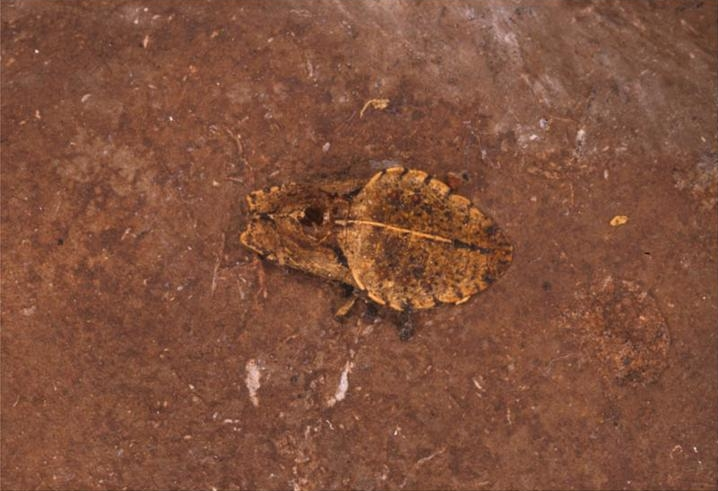
Pupa

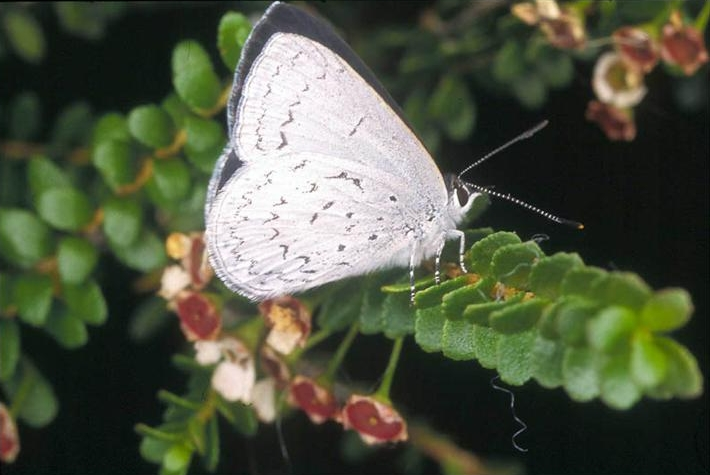
Female resting

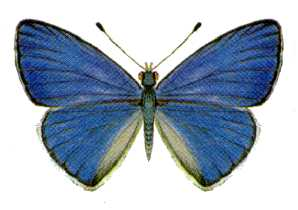
Illustration of a mounted specimen
