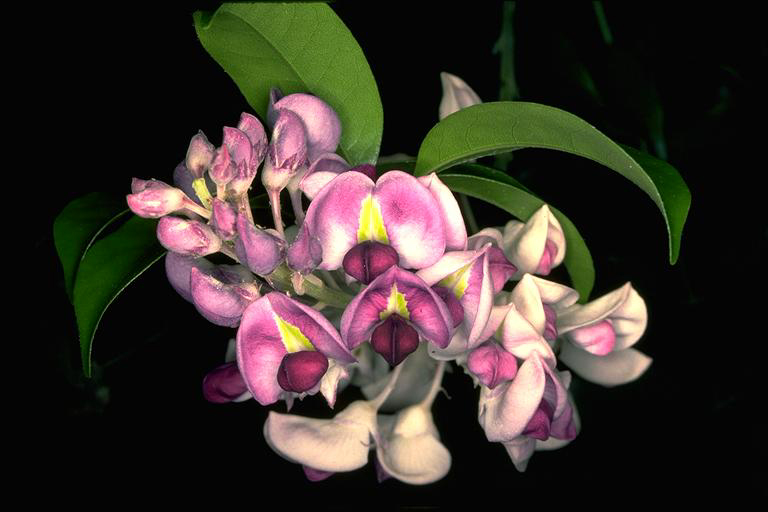
- In the Australian National Botanic Gardens

Scientific classification
- Kingdom: Plantae
- Clade: Tracheophytes
- Clade: Angiosperms
- Clade: Eudicots
- Clade: Rosids
- Order: Fabales
- Family: Fabaceae
- Subfamily: Faboideae
- Genus: Austrocallerya
- Species: A. megasperma

Binomial name
- Austrocallerya megasperma (F.Muell.) J.Compton & Schrire

Synonyms
- Callerya megasperma (F.Muell.) Schot; Kraunhia megasperma (F.Muell.) Greene; Millettia megasperma (F.Muell.) Benth.; Phaseoloides megaspermum (F.Muell.) Kuntze; Wisteria megasperma F.Muell.

= Austrocallerya megasperma =

Species of legume

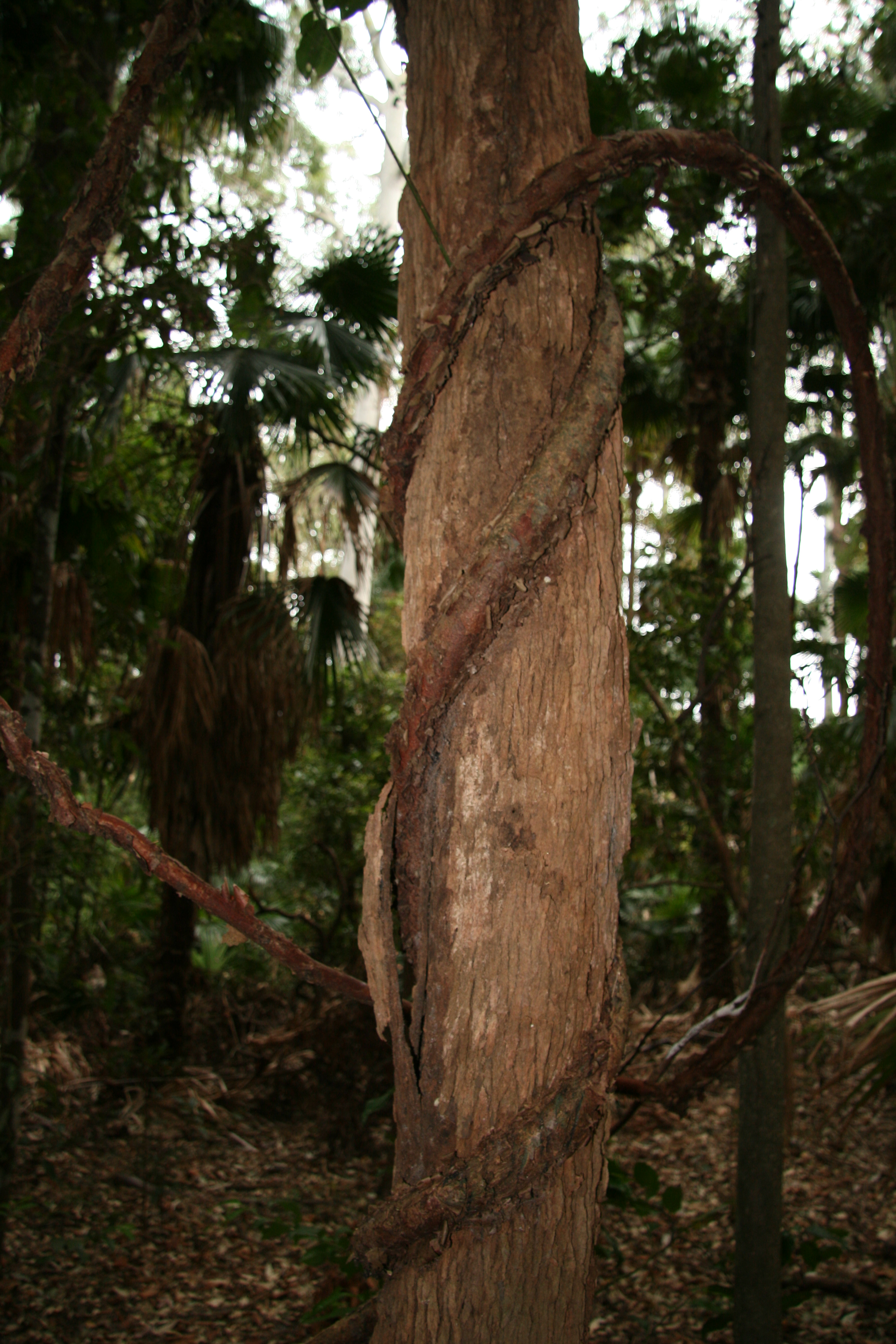
Vine on a tree trunk on the Sunshine Coast

Austrocallerya megasperma, one of several species commonly known as native wisteria, is a species of flowering plant in the family Fabaceae and is endemic to eastern Australia. It is a woody climber with pinnate leaves and racemes of purple, pea-like flowers.

== Description ==
Austrocallerya megasperma is a woody climber with stems up to 20 m (66 ft) long covered with flaky bark. Its leaves are 15–30 cm (5.9–11.8 in) long and pinnate with 7 to 19 oblong to egg-shaped leaflets with the narrower end towards the base, 4–10 cm (1.6–3.9 in) long and 2–3.5 cm (0.79–1.38 in) wide on a petiole 4–6 cm (1.6–2.4 in) long. The flowers are borne on a raceme 100–250 mm (3.9–9.8 in) long, each flower on a pedicel 10–20 mm (0.39–0.79 in) long, the sepals 3–5 mm (0.12–0.20 in) long and the petals 15–20 mm (0.59–0.79 in) long. Flowering occurs from July to October and the fruit is a woody, velvety pod 100–180 mm (3.9–7.1 in) long and 30–50 mm (1.2–2.0 in) wide, containing up to 4 more or less oval seeds.

== Taxonomy ==
This species was first formally described in 1858 by Ferdinand von Mueller who gave it the name Wisteria megasperma in his Fragmenta Phytographiae Australiae from specimens he collected with Walter Hill near the Pine River. In 1994, Anne M. Schot moved the species to Callerya as Callerya megasperma in the journal Blumea and in 2019, James A. Compton and Brian David Schrire moved it to their new genus Austrocallerya as Austrocallerya megasperma, based on the plant's morphology, and nuclear and chloroplast DNA sequences. The specific epithet (megasperma) is derived from the Ancient Greek words megas "large" and sperma "seed", and refers to its large seeds.

== Distribution ==
Austrocallerya megasperma grows in rainforest on the coast and nearby ranges of south-eastern Queensland and north-eastern New South Wales as far south as the Richmond River.

== Ecology ==
This vine is a valuable indicator species as it often grows in association with the birdwing butterfly vine (Aristolochia praevenosa), one of the only food plants for the caterpillars of the rare Richmond birdwing butterfly (Ornithoptera richmondia). Austrocallerya megasperma itself is a food plant for the caterpillars of the pencilled blue (Candalides absimilis) and narrow-banded awl (Hasora khoda) butterflies.

== Use in horticulture ==
Native wisteria is described as an attractive garden plant, but one that grows very rapidly when young and needs ample room to grow, and a structure which can bear its weight. It requires good drainage. It has been successfully cultivated in Melbourne, where it took 20 years to flower.
