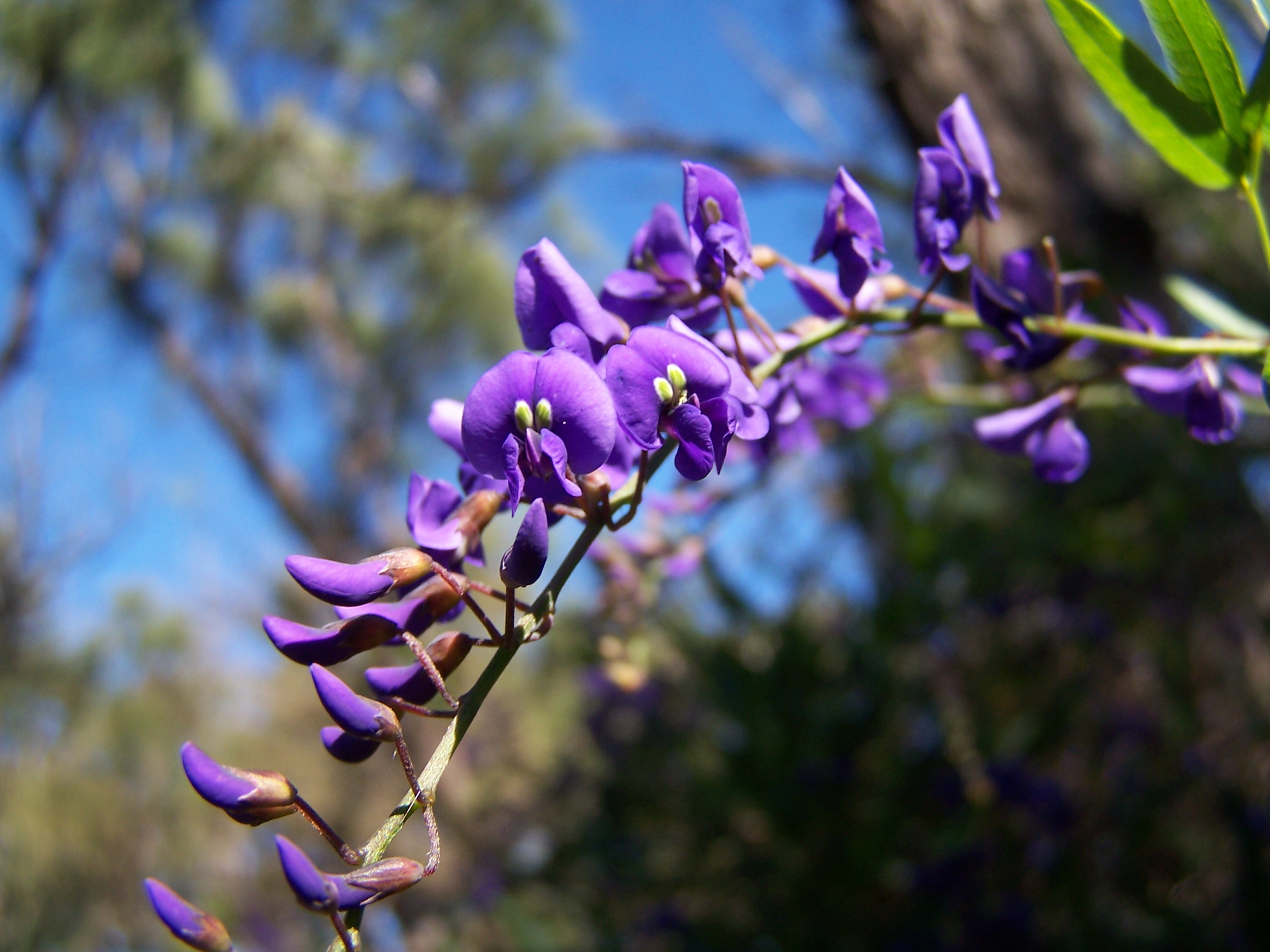
- Hardenbergia comptoniana

Scientific classification
- Kingdom: Plantae
- Clade: Tracheophytes
- Clade: Angiosperms
- Clade: Eudicots
- Clade: Rosids
- Order: Fabales
- Family: Fabaceae
- Subfamily: Faboideae
- Tribe: Phaseoleae
- Subtribe: Kennediinae
- Genus: Hardenbergia; Benth.

Type species
- Hardenbergia comptoniana (Andrews) Benth.

Species
- See text.

= Hardenbergia =

Genus of legumes

Hardenbergia is a genus of three species of flowering plants in the pea family, Fabaceae and is endemic to Australia. Plants in this genus are climbing or trailing herbs or subshrubs with pinnate leaves with one, three or five leaflets and groups of violet, white or pinkish flowers in pairs or small clusters in leaf axils. Species of Hardenbergia occur in all Australian states and in the Australian Capital Territory.

== Description ==
Plants in the genus Hardenbergia are climbing or trailing herbs or subshrubs with leaves arranged alternately along the stems. The leaves are pinnate with one, three of five leaflets with stipules at the base and stipellae at the base of the leaflets. The flowers are usually arranged in pairs or small clusters in leaf axils and are medium-sized, violet, white or pinkish, the standard petal with a yellowish or greenish centre. The sepals are joined at the base forming a tube with short teeth. The standard petal is more or less circular, the wings are sickle-shaped and longer than the keel. Nine of the lower stamens are fused into an open sheath and the style is thread-like. The fruit is an oblong pod.

== Taxonomy ==
The genus Hardenbergia was first formally described in 1837 by George Bentham in Stephan Endlicher's Enumeratio plantarum quas in Novae Hollandiae ora austro-occidentali ad fluvium Cygnorum et in sinu Regis Georgii collegit Carolus Liber Baro de Hügel. The genus was named in honour of Franziska, Countess von Hardenberg, a patron of botany and sister of Baron von Huegel who visited Australia in 1833.

The names of three species of Hardenbergia are accepted by the Australian Plant Census:

- Hardenbergia comptoniana (Andrews) Benth. (W.A.)
- Hardenbergia perbrevidens R.J.F.Hend. (Qld.)
- Hardenbergia violacea (Schneev.) Stearn (false sarsparilla, purple coral pea, waraburra) (S.A., Qld., N.S.W., A.C.T., Vic. Tas.)
