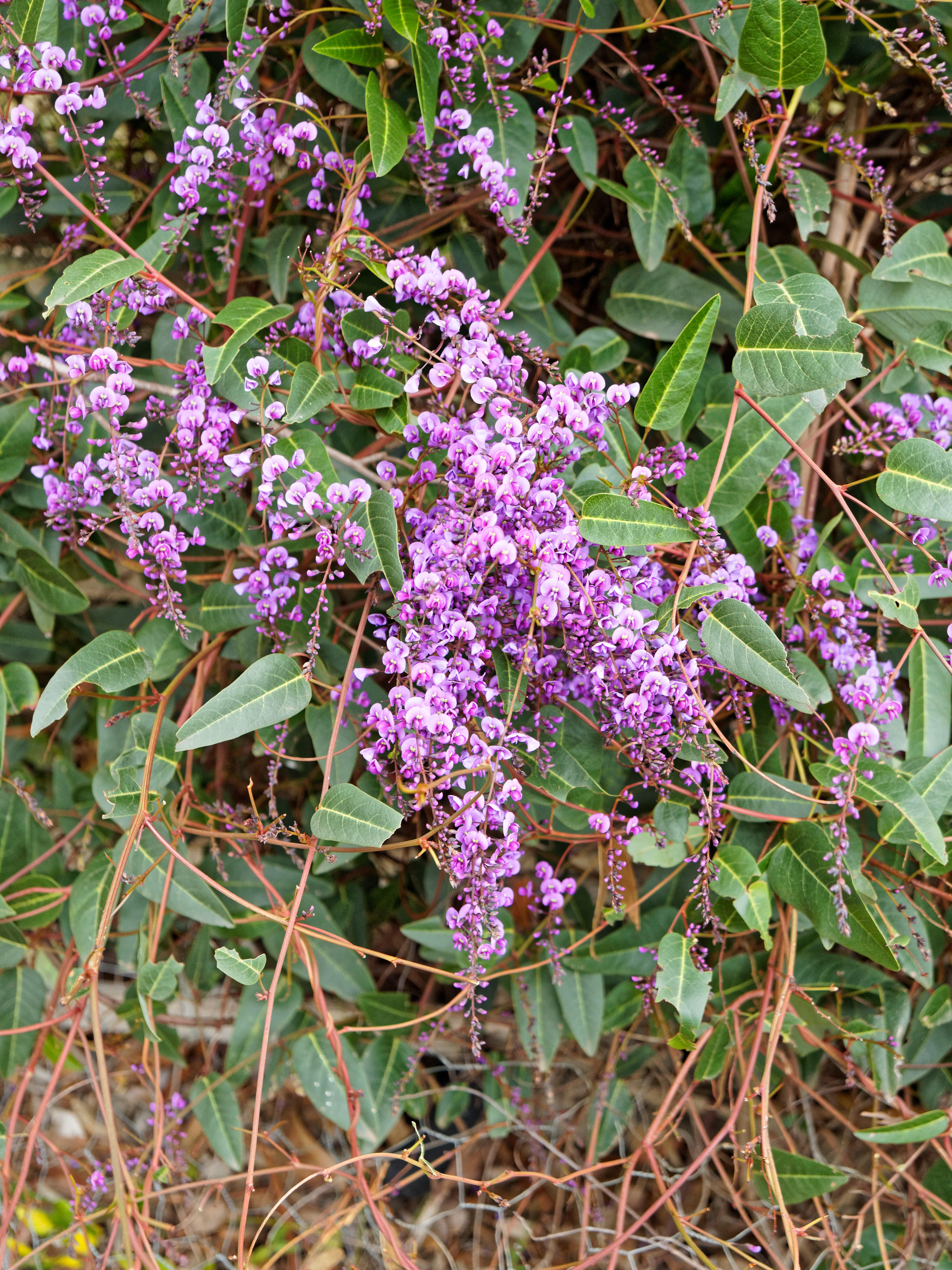

Scientific classification
- Kingdom: Plantae
- Clade: Tracheophytes
- Clade: Angiosperms
- Clade: Eudicots
- Clade: Rosids
- Order: Fabales
- Family: Fabaceae
- Subfamily: Faboideae
- Genus: Hardenbergia
- Species: H. violacea

Binomial name
- Hardenbergia violacea (Schneev.) Stearn

Synonyms
- List: Caulinia bimaculata (Curtis) Kuntze nom. illeg.; Caulinia monophylla (Vent.) F.Muell.; Caulinia monophylla (Vent.) F.Muell. var. monophylla; Glycine bimaculata Curtis; Glycine monophylla (Vent.) J.L.Parm. nom. illeg.; Glycine violacea Schneev.; Glycine virens Sol. ex Curtis nom. inval., pro syn.; Glycine virens Sol. ex Steud. nom. inval., pro syn.; Hardenbergia bimaculata (Curtis) Domin; Hardenbergia bimaculata (Curtis) Domin var. bimaculata; Hardenbergia bimaculata var. longiracemosa (Lodd.) Domin; Hardenbergia bimaculata var. typica Domin nom. inval.; Hardenbergia monophylla (Vent.) Benth.; Hardenbergia monophylla var. longiracemosa (Lodd., G.Lodd. & W.Lodd.) F.M.Bailey; Hardenbergia monophylla (Vent.) Benth. var. monophylla; Hardenbergia violacea f. alba Stearn; Hardenbergia violacea f. rosea Stearn; Hardenbergia violacea (Schneev.) Stearn f. violacea; Kennedia bimaculata Siebert & Voss nom. inval., pro syn.; Kennedia longiracemosa (Lindl.) Lodd., G.Lodd. & W.Lodd.; Kennedia monophylla Vent.; Kennedia monophylla var. bimaculata (Curtis) Heynh.; Kennedia monophylla var. longiracemosa Lindl.; Kennedia monophylla Vent. var. monophylla; Kennedya bimaculata Maund orth. var.; Kennedya monophylla Heynh. orth. var.; Kennedya monophylla var. bimaculata Heynh. orth. var.; Kennedya monophylla var. longiracemosa Lindl.

= Hardenbergia violacea =

Species of plant

Hardenbergia violacea is a species of flowering plant in the family Fabaceae and is endemic to Australia. It is known in Australia by the common names false sarsaparilla, purple coral pea, and waraburra. Elsewhere it is also called purple twining-pea, vine-lilac, and wild sarsaparilla. It is a prostrate or climbing subshrub with egg-shaped to narrow lance-shaped leaves and racemes of mostly purple flowers.

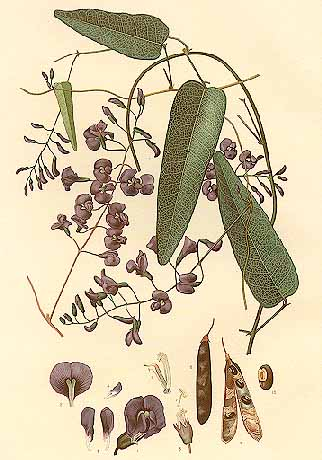
Illustration by Edward Minchen in Joseph Maiden's The Flowering Plants and Ferns of New South Wales, as Hardenbergia monophylla

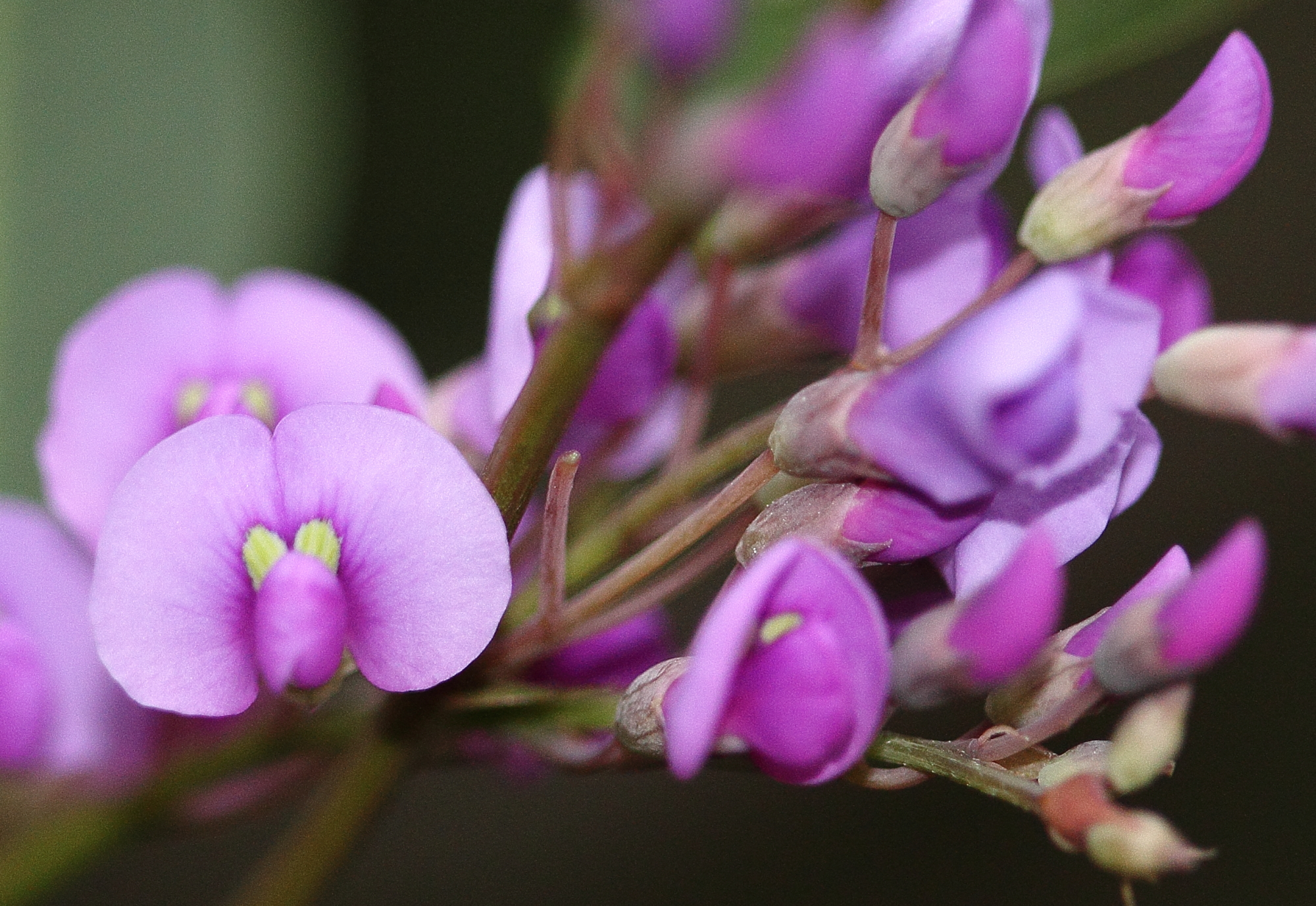
Blossom detail

== Description ==
Hardenbergia violacea is a prostrate or climbing sub-shrub with wiry stems up to 2 m (6 ft 7 in) or more long. The leaves are egg-shaped to lance-shaped, 30–100 mm (1.2–3.9 in) long and 10–50 mm (0.39–1.97 in) wide on a petiole about 10 mm (0.39 in) long. The leaves are leathery, glabrous and paler on the lower surface.

The flowers are arranged in racemes of between twenty and forty flowers, each on a pedicel mostly 2–4 mm (0.079–0.157 in) long. The sepals are 3–4 mm (0.12–0.16 in) long and joined at the base, forming a bell-shaped tube with triangular teeth. The petals are about 8 mm (0.31 in) long, mostly purple, the standard petal with a yellowish spot and a notch on the summit, the wings are egg-shaped with the narrower end towards the base and the keel is curved. Flowering mostly occurs from August to November and the fruit is a pod 20–45 mm (0.79–1.77 in) long containing between six and eight kidney-shaped seeds. The flowers are usually purple or violet, but pink, white and other colours sometimes occur.

H. violacea regrows from its roots after fire. The roots were experimented with by early European settlers as a substitute for sarsaparilla.

== Taxonomy ==
False sarsaparilla was first formally described in 1793 by George Voorhelm Schneevoogt who gave it the name Glycine violacea in his book, Icones Plantarum Rariorum. In 1940, William T. Stearn transferred the species to Hardenbergia as H. violacea in the Journal of Botany, British and Foreign.

== Distribution and habitat ==
Hardenbergia violacea grows in a variety of habitats but is more common in open forests, woodlands and undisturbed areas, from sea level to about 1,000 m (3,300 ft) above sea level. It occurs in eastern Queensland, eastern New South Wales, south-eastern Victoria and southern South Australia. There is a single population in Tasmania, where the species is listed as "endangered" under the Tasmanian Government Threatened Species Protection Act 1995.

== Use in horticulture ==
Hardenbergia violacea is widely grown as a garden plant, with many cultivars now available. It is hardy in mild and coastal areas of the United Kingdom where temperatures do not fall below −5 °C (23 °F), but it does require a sheltered, south or west facing situation. Alternatively it may be grown indoors with full daylight, for instance in an unheated conservatory or greenhouse. It has been given the Royal Horticultural Society's Award of Garden Merit.

The seeds of H. violacea remain viable for many years and propagation is from seeds that have been treated by adding boiling water to them or by abrading the seed coat. Plants prefer full sun in well-drained soil, are moderately frost-tolerant and respond well to pruning.
