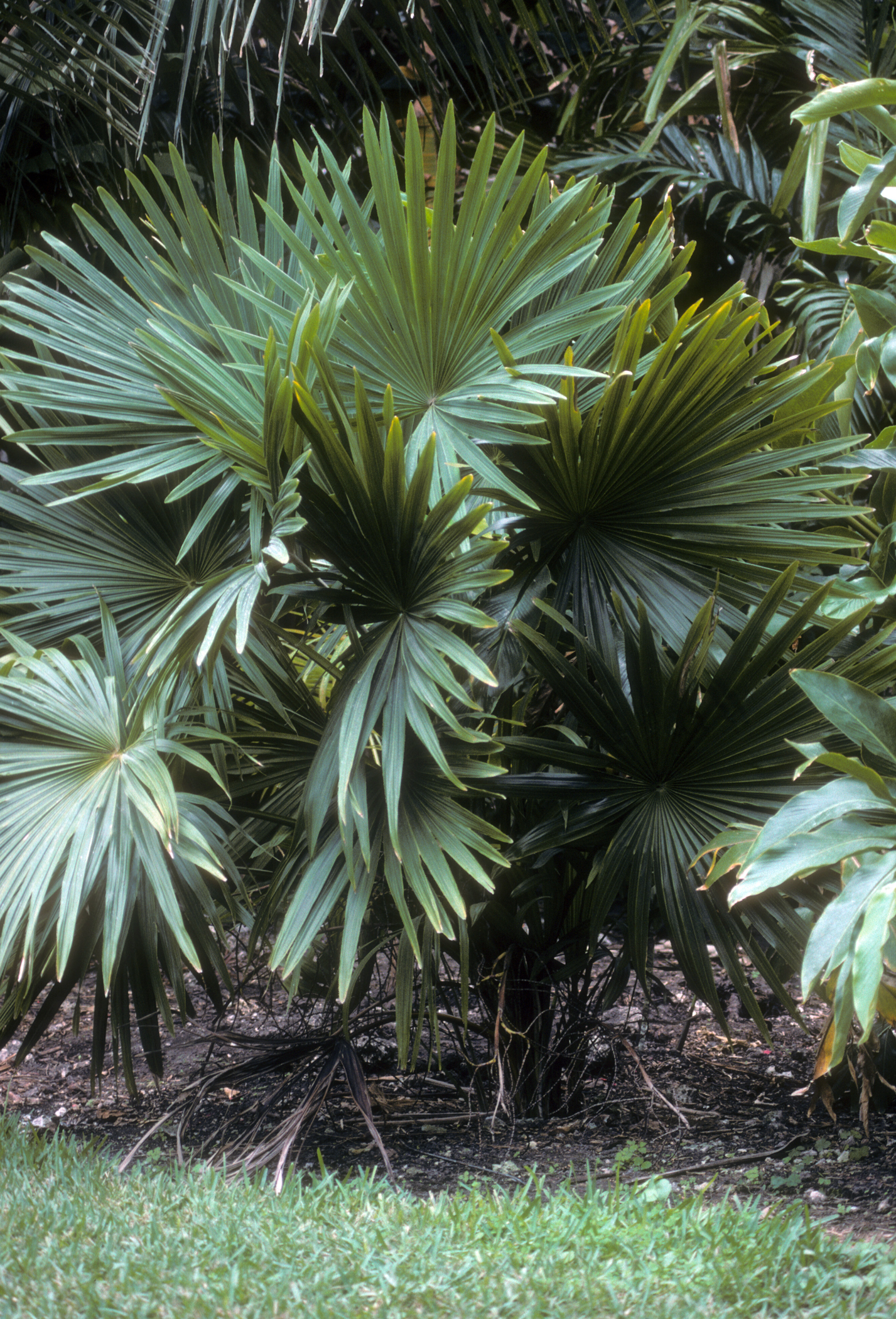
- Chuniophoenix hainanensis

Scientific classification
- Kingdom: Plantae
- Clade: Tracheophytes
- Clade: Angiosperms
- Clade: Monocots
- Clade: Commelinids
- Order: Arecales
- Family: Arecaceae
- Subfamily: Coryphoideae
- Tribe: Chuniophoeniceae
- Genus: Chuniophoenix; Burret

Type species
- Chuniophoenix hainanensis

= Chuniophoenix =

Genus of palms

Chuniophoenix is a genus of palm tree named after Chun Woon-Young, then director of the Botanical Institute, Sun Yat Sen University, Guangzhou. It contains three known species, native to southern China and Vietnam. Chuniophoenix is a member of tribe Chuniophoeniceae, a small group of palms that exhibit great morphological diversity and interesting biogeography. The tribe includes four genera: Chuniophoenix with 3 species in China and Vietnam, Kerriodoxa (monotypic) in Peninsular Malaysia and Thailand, Nannorrhops (monotypic) from Arabia to Afghanistan, and Tahina (monotypic) in Madagascar.

Image	Name	Distribution
	Chuniophoenix hainanensis Burret	China: Hainan
	Chuniophoenix nana Burret	China: Hainan and northern Vietnam
	Chuniophoenix suoitienensis Henderson	Southern Vietnam
