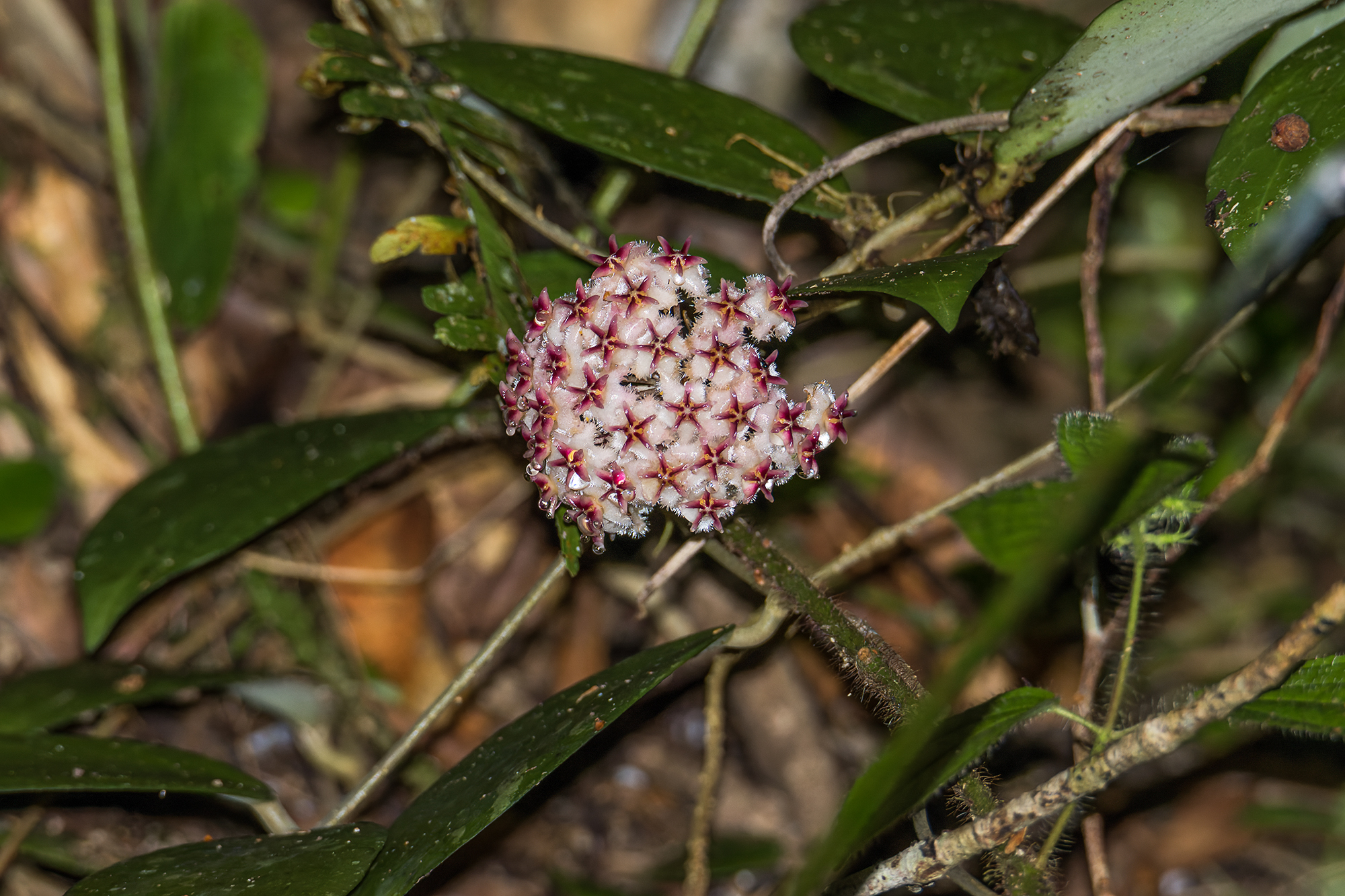
- In southern Thailand

Scientific classification
- Kingdom: Plantae
- Clade: Embryophytes
- Clade: Tracheophytes
- Clade: Spermatophytes
- Clade: Angiosperms
- Clade: Eudicots
- Clade: Asterids
- Order: Gentianales
- Family: Apocynaceae
- Genus: Hoya
- Species: H. erythrostemma

Binomial name
- Hoya erythrostemma Kerr

Synonyms
- Hoya mindorensis subsp. erythrostemma (Kerr) Kloppenb.

= Hoya erythrostemma =

Species of plant

Hoya erythrostemma is a species of flowering plant in the family Apocynaceae. It is native to Myanmar, Thailand, and Vietnam. A climber, it is typically found growing alongside watercourses in wet tropical areas.
