= Emily Collins (disambiguation) =

Emily Collins (born 1990) is a former New Zealand cyclist.

Emily Collins may also refer to:

- Emily Collins (botanist) (1858–c. 1945), English botanist
- Emily Parmely Collins (1814–1909), American writer and suffragette

== See also ==
- Emily Collinge (born 1988), British runner
