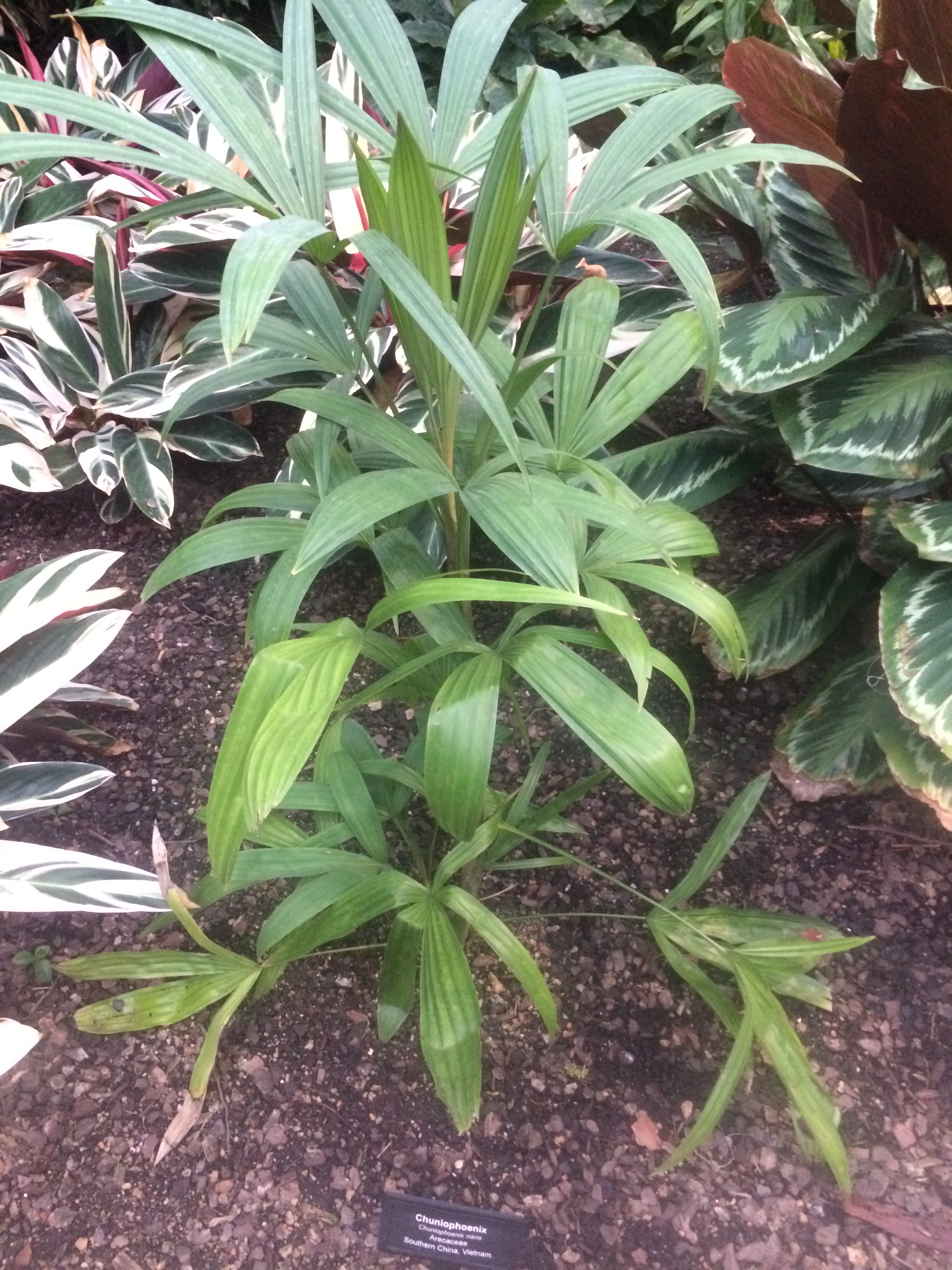
- Chuniophoenix nana in cultivation at Garfield Park Conservatory

Scientific classification
- Kingdom: Plantae
- Clade: Tracheophytes
- Clade: Angiosperms
- Clade: Monocots
- Clade: Commelinids
- Order: Arecales
- Family: Arecaceae
- Subfamily: Coryphoideae
- Tribe: Chuniophoeniceae; J.Dransf., N.W.Uhl, C. Asmussen, W.J. Baker, M.M. Harley & C.E. Lewis

Type genus
- Chuniophoenix Burret

Genera
- Chuniophoenix Burret; Kerriodoxa J.Dransf. Nannorrhops H.Wendl. Tahina J.Dransf. & Rakotoarinivo

= Chuniophoeniceae =

Tribe of palms

Chuniophoeniceae is a tribe of palms in subfamily Coryphoideae of plant family Arecaceae. The four genera within the tribe are morphologically dissimilar and do not have overlapping distributions. Three of the genera are monotypic, while the fourth genus (Chuniophoenix) has three species.

== Description ==
Outwardly, the palms in the four genera of Chuniophoeniceae appear quite different. Chuniophoenix are small palms from the forest understory with clustered stems; Kerriodoxa is a squat, single-stemmed rainforest palm; Nannorrhops is a sprawling desert palm with branching stems; and Tahina is a massive solitary palm from exposed limestone outcrops. They differ significantly in their flowering strategies, too. Chuniophoenix species flower regularly throughout their lives (pleonanthic) and produce hermaphroditic flowers (rarely single gender); Kerriodoxa are also pleonanthic, but are always dioecious; Nannorrhops stems die after flowering (hapaxanthic), though the much-branched plant survives; Tahina produces a massive terminal inflorescence and dies after fruiting. All Chuniophoeniceae have palmate leaves with induplicate folds and tubular bracts partially enclosing the flowers.

== Taxonomy ==
Chuniophoeniceae is one of eight tribes in subfamily Coryphoideae. The tribe is monophyletic and closely related to tribes Caryoteae, Corypheae and Borasseae, forming the syncarpous clade. In a previous classification, prior to the discovery of Tahina, the three other genera were placed in tribe Corypheae, subtribe Coryphinae, together with the genus Corypha. Coincidentally, Corypha and Tahina both share the strategy of producing a massive display of flowers only once before dying.

The four genera have widely disjunct distributions. Chuniophoenix (3 spp.) is found in southern China and Vietnam; Kerriodoxa (1 sp., K. elegans) is restricted to peninsular Thailand; Nannorrhops (1 sp., N. ritchiana) is found in parts of Iran, Afghanistan, Pakistan and the southeastern Arabian Peninsula; while Tahina (1 sp., T. spectabilis) is endemic to a small area of northwestern Madagascar.

=== Genera ===
Image	Genus	Living species
	Chuniophoenix Burret, 1937	Chuniophoenix hainanensis Burret - China: Hainan; Chuniophoenix nana Burret - China: Hainan and northern Vietnam; Chuniophoenix suoitienensis Henderson - Southern Vietnam
	Kerriodoxa J.Dransf., 1983	Kerriodoxa elegans, white backed palm
	Nannorrhops H.Wendl., 1879	Nannorrhops ritchiana, the Mazari palm
	Tahina J.Dransf. & Rakotoarinivo, 2008	Tahina spectabilis, the tahina palm

== Gallery ==
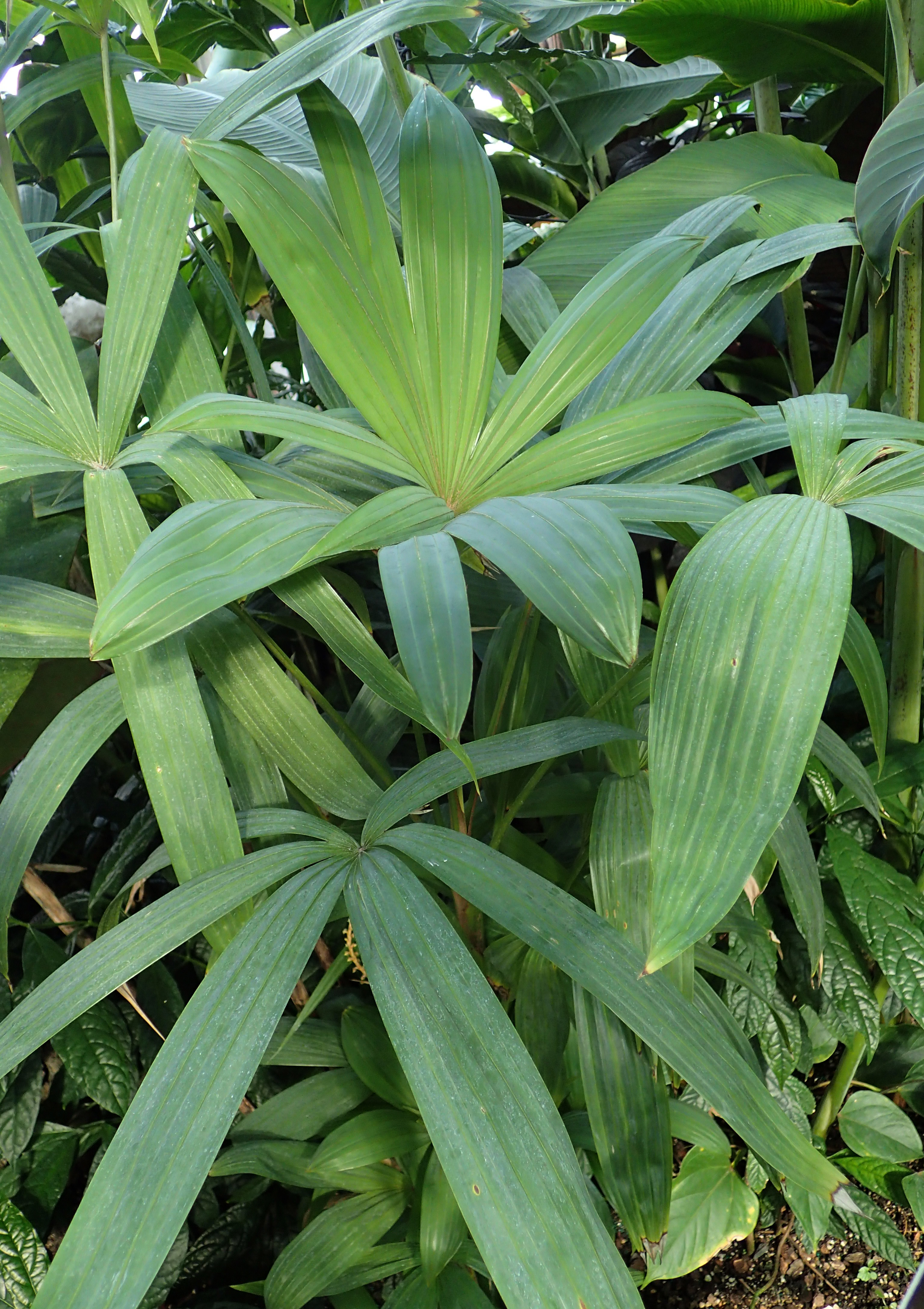
Foliage of Chuniophoenix nana

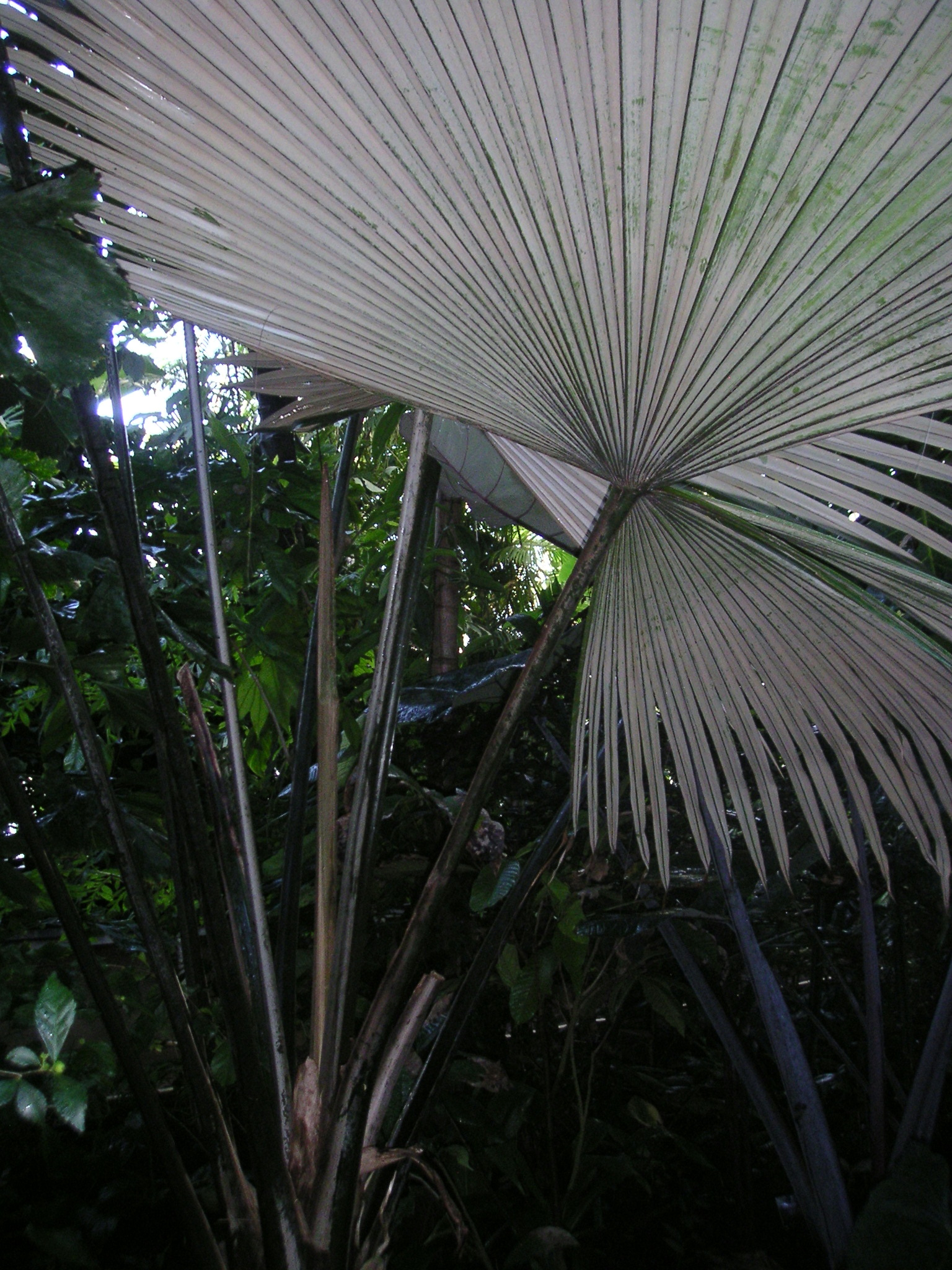
Distinctive white undersides to the leaves of Kerriodoxa elegans

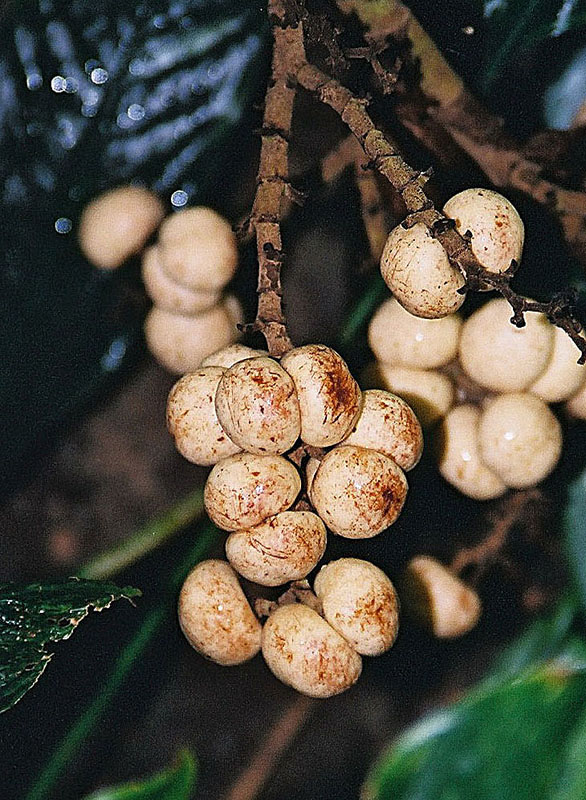
Fruits of Kerriodoxa elegans

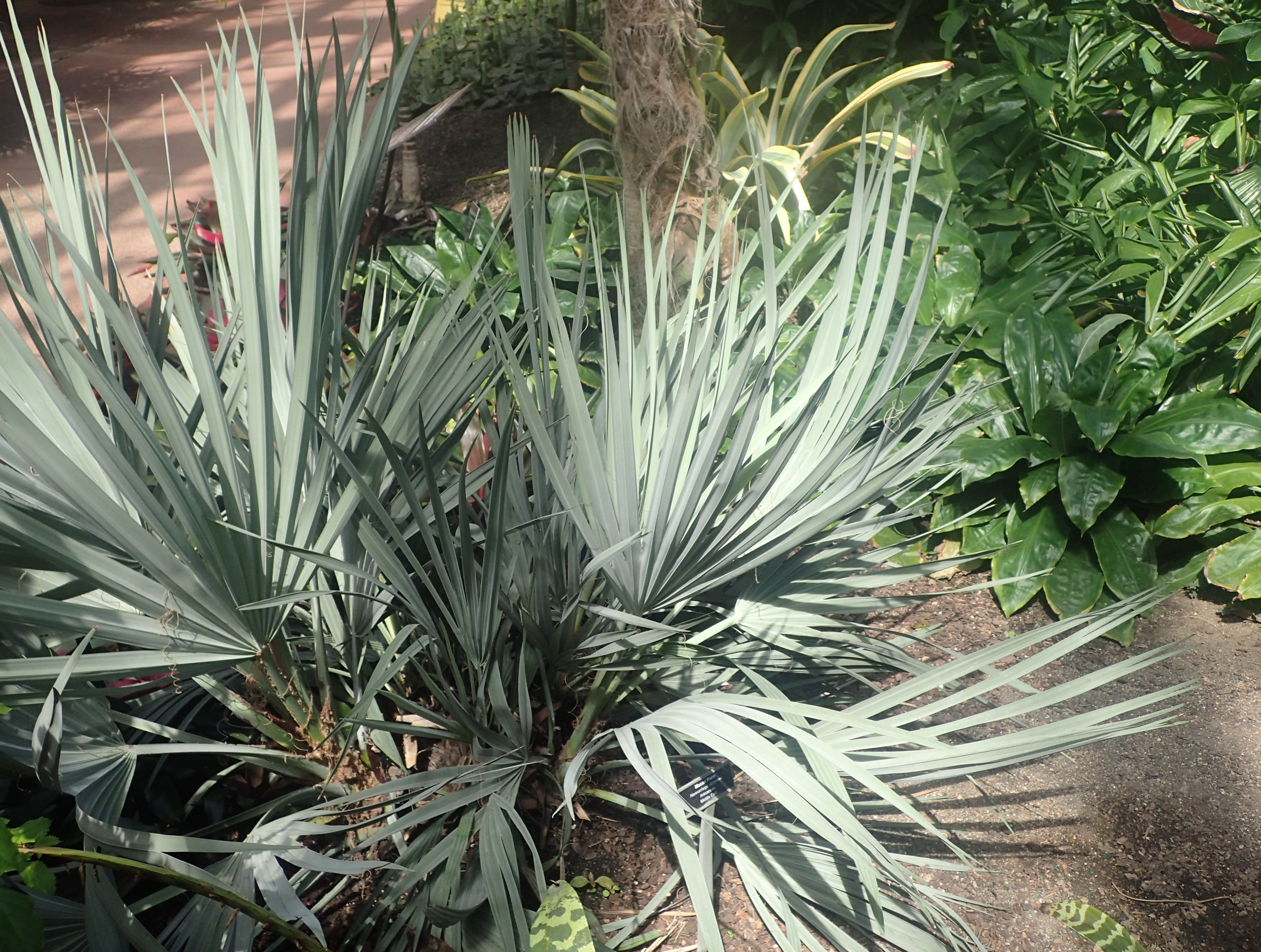
Silvery-blue foliage of Nannorrhops ritchiana

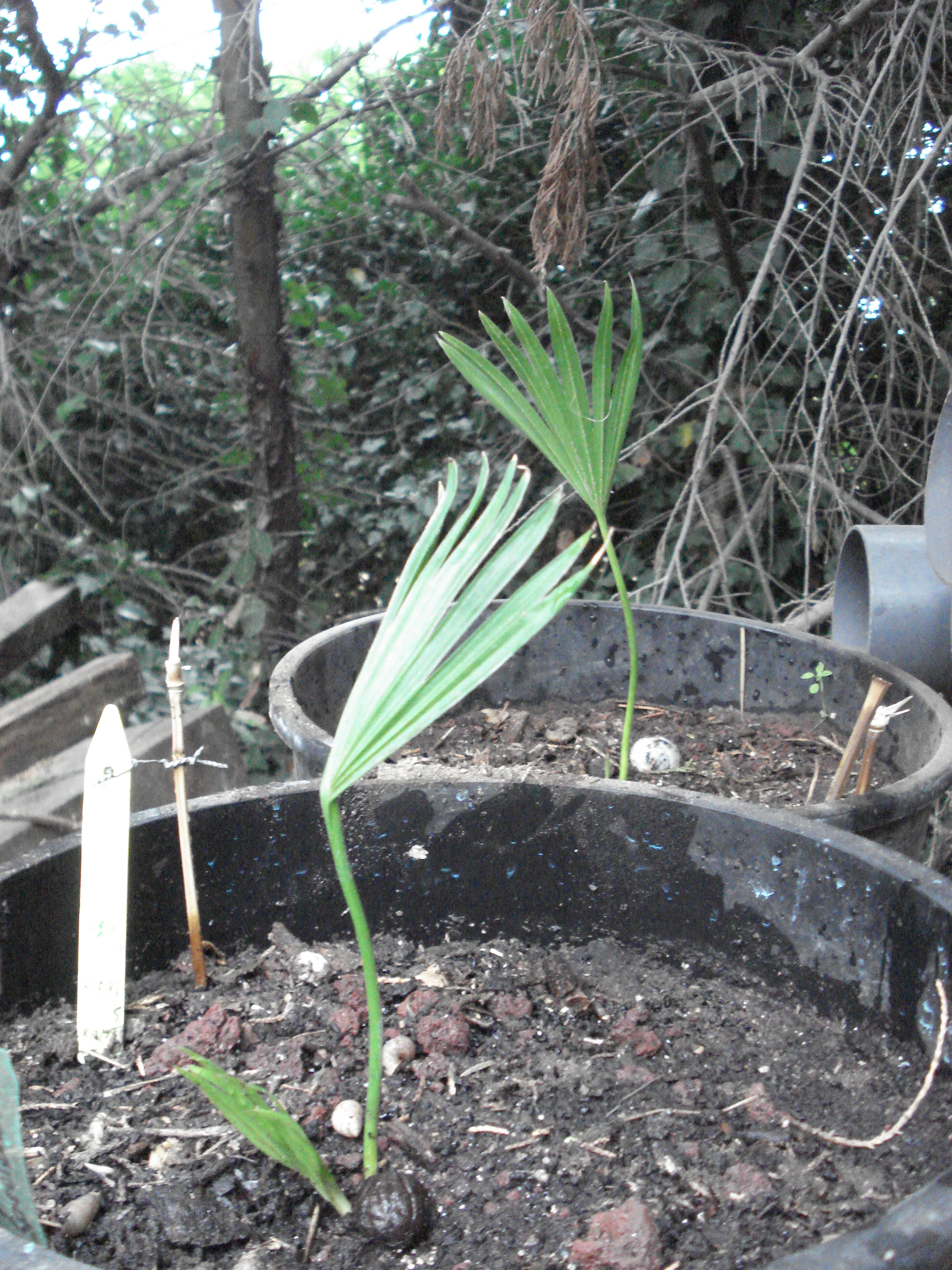
Seedlings of Tahina spectabilis in cultivation
