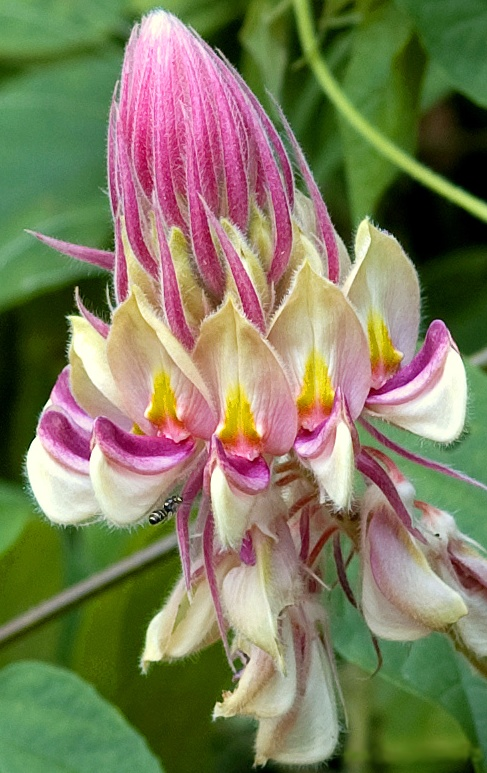
- Afgekia sericea

Scientific classification
- Kingdom: Plantae
- Clade: Tracheophytes
- Clade: Angiosperms
- Clade: Eudicots
- Clade: Rosids
- Order: Fabales
- Family: Fabaceae
- Subfamily: Faboideae
- Tribe: Wisterieae
- Genus: Afgekia; Craib

Species
- See text.

= Afgekia =

Genus of legumes

Afgekia is a small genus of large perennial climbing shrubs native to Thailand in Asia, belonging to the family Fabaceae. They are reminiscent of the related genus Wisteria.

== Description ==
The two species of Afgekia are scrambling climbers, reaching 10–20 m (33–66 ft) high. The mature stems are brown. The leaves are evergreen and generally have 8–16 paired leaflets plus a terminal leaflet. The leaflets are 3–14 cm (1.2–5.5 in) long by 1–7 cm (0.4–2.8 in) wide. The erect inflorescence is a leafy raceme, 30–70 cm (12–28 in) long. The individual flowers are 23–25 mm (0.9–1.0 in) long and have the general shape of members of the subfamily Faboideae. The standard petal is 15–28 mm (0.6–1.1 in) long by 20–25 mm (0.8–1.0 in) wide, cream in colour with pale pink to purple markings and a pale or dark yellow or greenish nectar guide. The deep pink or purple wing petals are more or less equal in length to the keel at 20–25 mm (0.8–1.0 in) long by 5–7 mm (0.2–0.3 in) wide, with short basal claws. The white keel petals are 23–26 mm (0.9–1.0 in) long by 7–15 mm (0.3–0.6 in) wide. Nine of the stamens are fused together, the other is free; all curve upwards at the apex. The inflated seed pods are 6–15 cm (2.4–5.9 in) long by 3–4 cm (1.2–1.6 in) wide, splitting when ripe to release the 2 or 3 seeds.

== Taxonomy ==
The genus Afgekia was established by William Grant Craib in 1927, initially with one species, Afgekia sericea. The genus name commemorates Arthur Francis George Kerr, being formed from his initials. Kerr was an Irish physician and pioneering botanist in Thailand in the early twentieth century. The type specimen of Afgekia sericea was collected by Kerr's Thai associate Anuwat.

A 2019 molecular phylogenetic study showed that one of the species then placed in Afgekia (A. filipes, now Padbruggea filipes) did not belong in the genus, but that the remaining two species formed a well separated clade, sister to Kanburia, in turn forming a larger clade with Callerya, Serawaia and Whitfordiodendron. Morphological characters that distinguish Afgekia from other genera include two rather than one pair of callosities on the standard petal and the longest stipules and floral bracts in the tribe Wisterieae.

=== Species ===
As of January 2023, Plants of the World Online accepted two species:

- Afgekia mahidoliae B.L.Burtt & Chermsir.
- Afgekia sericea Craib
