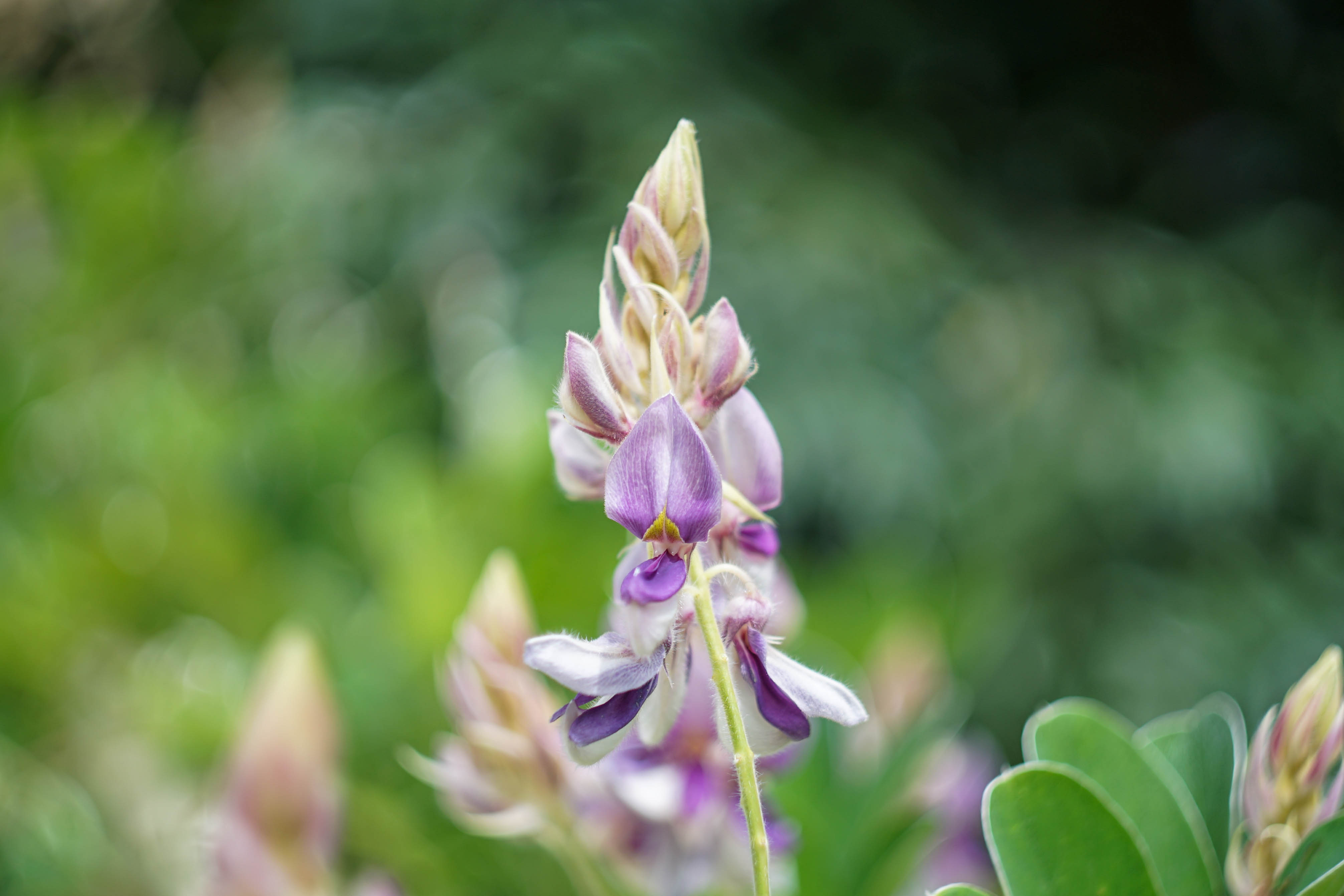

Scientific classification
- Kingdom: Plantae
- Clade: Tracheophytes
- Clade: Angiosperms
- Clade: Eudicots
- Clade: Rosids
- Order: Fabales
- Family: Fabaceae
- Subfamily: Faboideae
- Genus: Afgekia
- Species: A. mahidoliae

Binomial name
- Afgekia mahidoliae B.L.Burtt & Chermsir.

= Afgekia mahidoliae =

Kan phai Mahidol

Species of legume

Afgekia mahidoliae, known as Kan Phai Mahidol (กันภัยมหิดล), is a type of vine in the family Fabaceae. It is found in Kanchanaburi province, Thailand. Its leaves are compound with 4–6 pairs of leaflets. The stem has several petiolules. The dorsal side of the leaf has brown colored hairs. The flower is an erect panicle with white and purple color. The pod is flat, short and round. Its scientific name is in honor of Srinagarindra.

This vine was first scientifically described in Thailand by Kasem Chandraprasong, then Assistant Professor Jirayupin (Chirmsiriwattana) Chadraprasong and B. L. Burtt published its description and name and called it "kan phai Mahidol".

The plant was made the symbolic plant of Mahidol University on February 19, 1999. The reasons were that it was discovered in Thailand, it is easy to plant, and it has a name similar to the university's. Moreover, the vine's characteristics were said to signify prosperity and the ability to adapt to a changing environment, as it can be set into various types of bushes and can sprout anew after withering.
