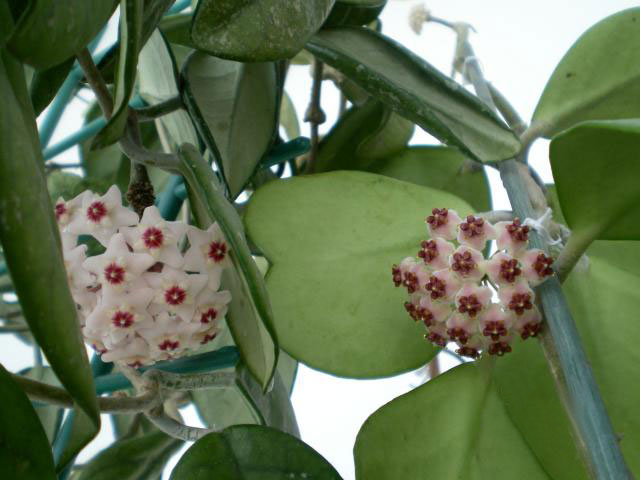
- Inflorescence and leaves

Scientific classification
- Kingdom: Plantae
- Clade: Tracheophytes
- Clade: Angiosperms
- Clade: Eudicots
- Clade: Asterids
- Order: Gentianales
- Family: Apocynaceae
- Genus: Hoya
- Species: H. kerrii

Binomial name
- Hoya kerrii Craib

Synonyms
- Hoya obovata var. kerrii (Craib) Costantin

= Hoya kerrii =

Species of plant

Hoya kerrii is a species of plant in the family Apocynaceae, native to Southeast Asia. Its eponymous collector is Arthur Francis George Kerr, Irish physician and botanist.

As the thick leaves are heart-shaped, the plant is sometimes named "lucky-heart". In Europe, it is sold for Saint Valentine's Day.

Its origin area is South China, Vietnam, Laos, Cambodia, Thailand and the Indonesian island of Java.

== Description ==
Hoya kerrii is a climbing plant that can grow up to 4 meters high (around 13 feet). Stems have a diameter of 7 mm. The leaves are 6 cm wide, 5 mm thick. Adult plants show inflorescences of 5 cm diameter and up to 25 flowers. They produce small balls of nectar, coloured red to brown. The flowers produce their scent at night.

== Taxonomy ==
The species was described by William Grant Craib in 1911 from specimens that Arthur Francis George Kerr collected in jungle on Doi Suthep, near Chiang Mai in northern Thailand, at an altitude of 390 m (Kerr 1810). The type sheets of this collection at Kew are dated 29 April 1911. Kerr also sent a living plant to the Royal Botanic Gardens at Glasnevin, Dublin (now the National Botanic Gardens), where it flowered in August 1911. Craib noted that it differed from the wild specimens only in having sparse, minute hairs on the stem, peduncle and leaves, which he suggested might be due to the change in climate.

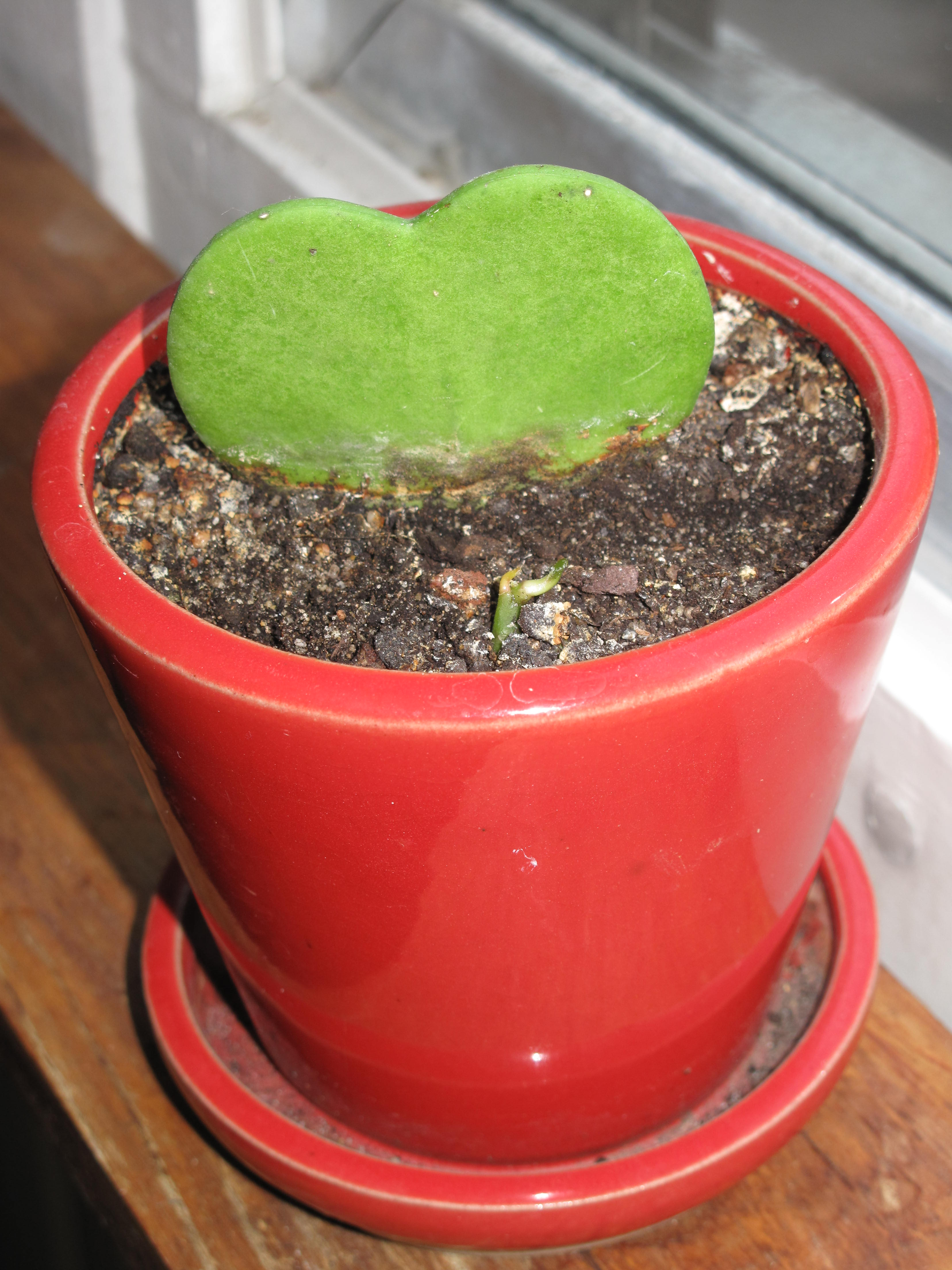
Young plant, unchanged over 2 years

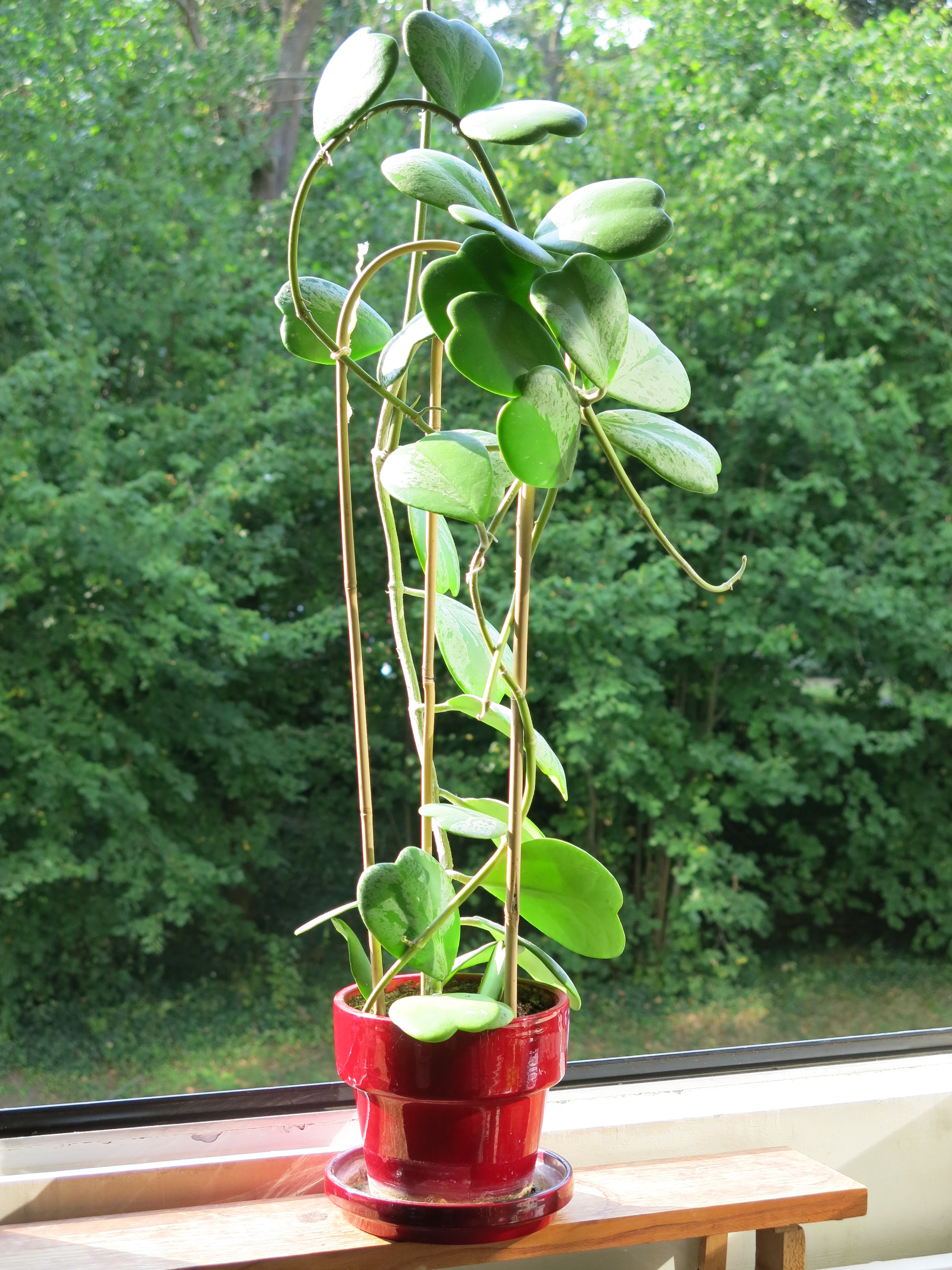
After 20 months of growth
