= Kerriothyrsus =

Scientific classification
- Kingdom: Plantae
- Clade: Tracheophytes
- Clade: Angiosperms
- Clade: Eudicots
- Clade: Rosids
- Order: Myrtales
- Family: Melastomataceae
- Genus: Kerriothyrsus; C.Hansen
- Species: K. tetrandrus

Binomial name
- Kerriothyrsus tetrandrus (Nayar) C.Hansen

Synonyms
- Scorpiothyrsus tetrandrus Nayar

Genus of plants

Kerriothyrsus is a monotypic genus of flowering plants belonging to the family Melastomataceae. The only species is Kerriothyrsus tetrandrus (Nayar) C.Hansen

Its native range is Indo-China. It is found in Laos and Vietnam.

The genus name of Kerriothyrsus is in honour of Arthur Francis George Kerr (1877–1942), an Irish medical doctor. The Latin specific epithet of tetrandrus which is derived from a compound of 2 roots; tetra from the Greek τετρα meaning four and also andros meaning anthered (having anthers).

Both genus and species were first described and published in Willdenowia Vol.17 on page 154 in 1988.
