= Emily Collins (botanist) =

British botanist

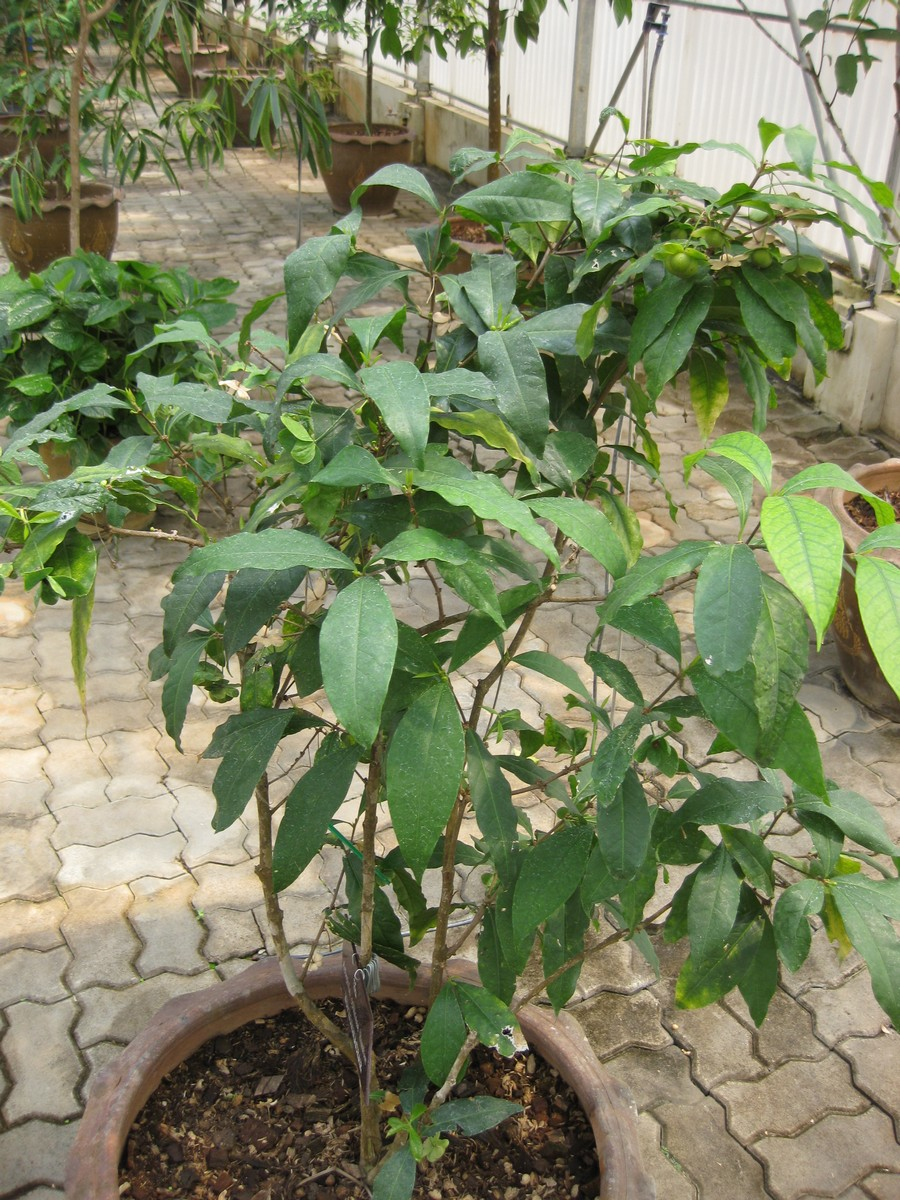
Actephila collinsiae Hunter ex Craib. Named in honour of Emily Collins. Gardenology.org

Elian Emily Collins (née Pemberton 4 September 1858 - c.1945) was an English botanist, naturalist and an early collector of plant specimens in Thailand. She discovered several plant species new to science and had numerous species named after her. Her estate was settled in 1953 when she left her house, Collinston to the British Embassy.

== Biography ==
=== Early life ===
Collins was born in British Burma on 4 September 1858. Her baptism, 12th April 1865, was recorded in Moulenin. She married David John Collins, a surveyor, and travelled with him to Thailand in 1877.

=== Collecting work ===
Collins was an early collector of plant specimens in Thailand. She collected plants mainly in the regions of Chonburi (Si Racha) and Chanthaburi between 1902 and 1938.

She was encouraged in her collecting efforts by Dr Arthur Francis George Kerr whom she met in Si Racha in September 1911. Collins frequently sent Dr Kerr specimens which were incorporated into his private herbarium. These specimens are now held at the Natural History Museum, London. Collins also sent specimens to other botanists as well as to the Royal Botanic Gardens, Kew.

She corresponded with Professor William Grant Craib, Regius Professor of Botany at Aberdeen University and author of Florae Siamensis Enumeratio. Collins was recognised by him as one of two important collectors who supplied specimens to the Royal Botanical Gardens herbarium from the Si Racha area in Thailand. The other collector being Dr Kerr.

Collins corresponded with Sir Arthur William Hill, Director of the Royal Botanic Gardens, Kew. As well as providing specimens, she sent photographs and information on common names and economic uses of local plants she collected and supplied Kew. She also corresponded with Sir David Prain and through him provided Trinity College, Dublin with specimens.

Her specimens are held in Herbaria around the world including in the Department of Agriculture Herbarium (BK), Bangkok, Harvard University Herbarium, The Natural History Museum, Royal Botanic Gardens Kew, Missouri Botanical Garden Herbarium, New York Botanical Garden Herbarium and the United States National Herbarium. After Collins stopped collecting in 1938 very few botanists appeared to collect systematically in this area of Thailand until the mid 1970s.

Collins was among the first members of The Natural History Society of Siam when it was established on 6 March 1914. This organisation became a section of the Siam Society in 1925. Collins was instrumental in releasing the mosquito eating fish Gamusia into Thailand waters in January 1929.

=== Awards ===
Collins was made a Member of the Most Excellent Order of the British Empire (MBE) in the King's Birthday Honours List of 1938.

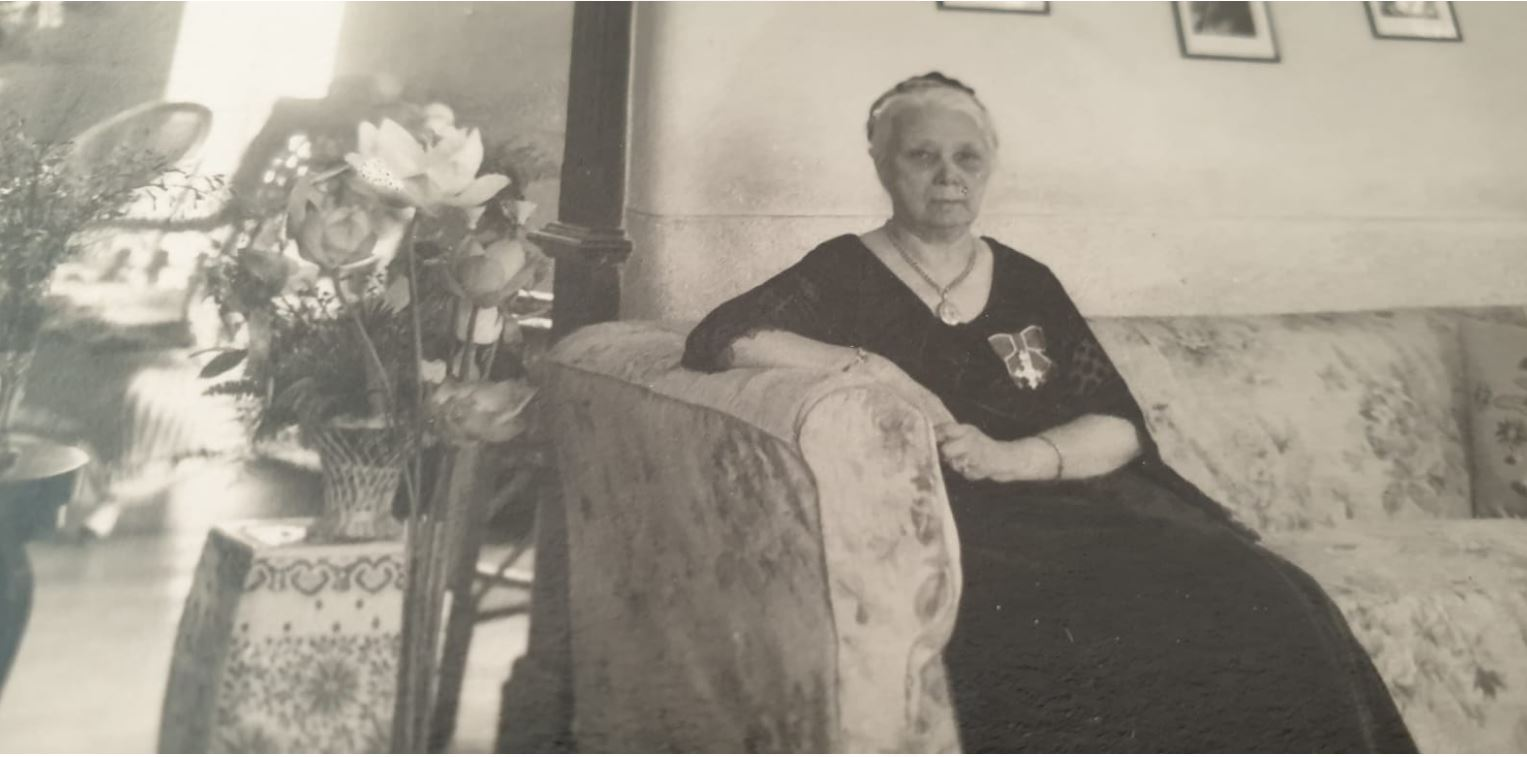
Emily Collins at her home in Bangkok, wearing her MBE award. The house was bequeathed to the British Government and became for a while the British Embassy.

=== Species named in Collins' honour ===
Several plant species have the descriptive term "collinsae" or "collinsiae" in their name in her honour. These include

- Actephila collinsiae
- Ardisia collinsae
- Lagerstroemia collinsae
- Rivea collinsae
- Eugenia collinsae
- Stemona collinsiae
- Tarenna collinsae
- Mitrephora collinsae
- Zanthoxylum collinsae
- Argyreia collinsae
- Phyllanthus collinsiae

=== Death ===
She continued to reside in Thailand until her death sometime after World War II.
