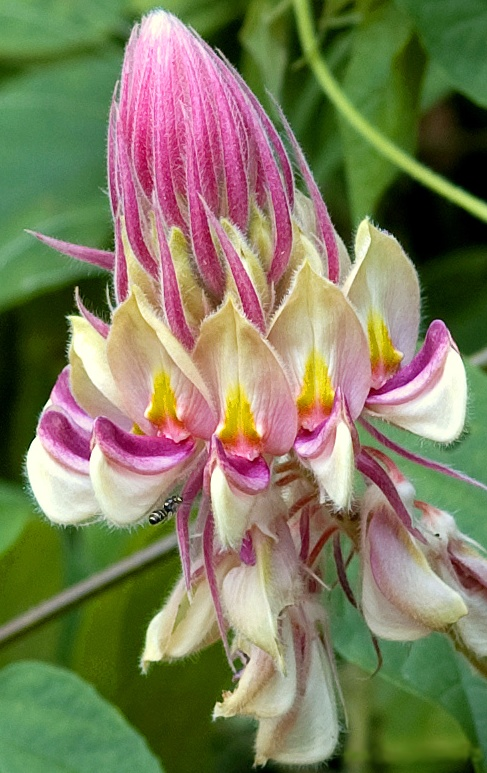

Scientific classification
- Kingdom: Plantae
- Clade: Tracheophytes
- Clade: Angiosperms
- Clade: Eudicots
- Clade: Rosids
- Order: Fabales
- Family: Fabaceae
- Subfamily: Faboideae
- Genus: Afgekia
- Species: A. sericea

Binomial name
- Afgekia sericea Craib

= Afgekia sericea =

Species of plant

Afgekia sericea is a species of flowering plant in the family Fabaceae, native to Thailand. It was first described by William Grant Craib in 1927. It is a liana.
