= Arthur Francis George Kerr =

Arthur Francis George Kerr (1877–1942) was an Irish medical doctor. He is known particularly now for his botanical work, which was important for the study of the flora of Thailand.

He encouraged other botanists to collect plant specimens in Thailand, in particular Emily Collins

A number of plant species are named after him, including Dipterocarpus kerrii, Hoya kerrii, Loranthus kerrii, Nepenthes kerrii, Platanus kerrii and Rafflesia kerrii.

Also several plant genus honour his name including Kerriochloa, Kerriodoxa, Kerriothyrsus, and also the genus Afgekia which is an abbreviation of his names.

He also originated some botanical names, for example, the genus name Dimetra (Oleaceae).
