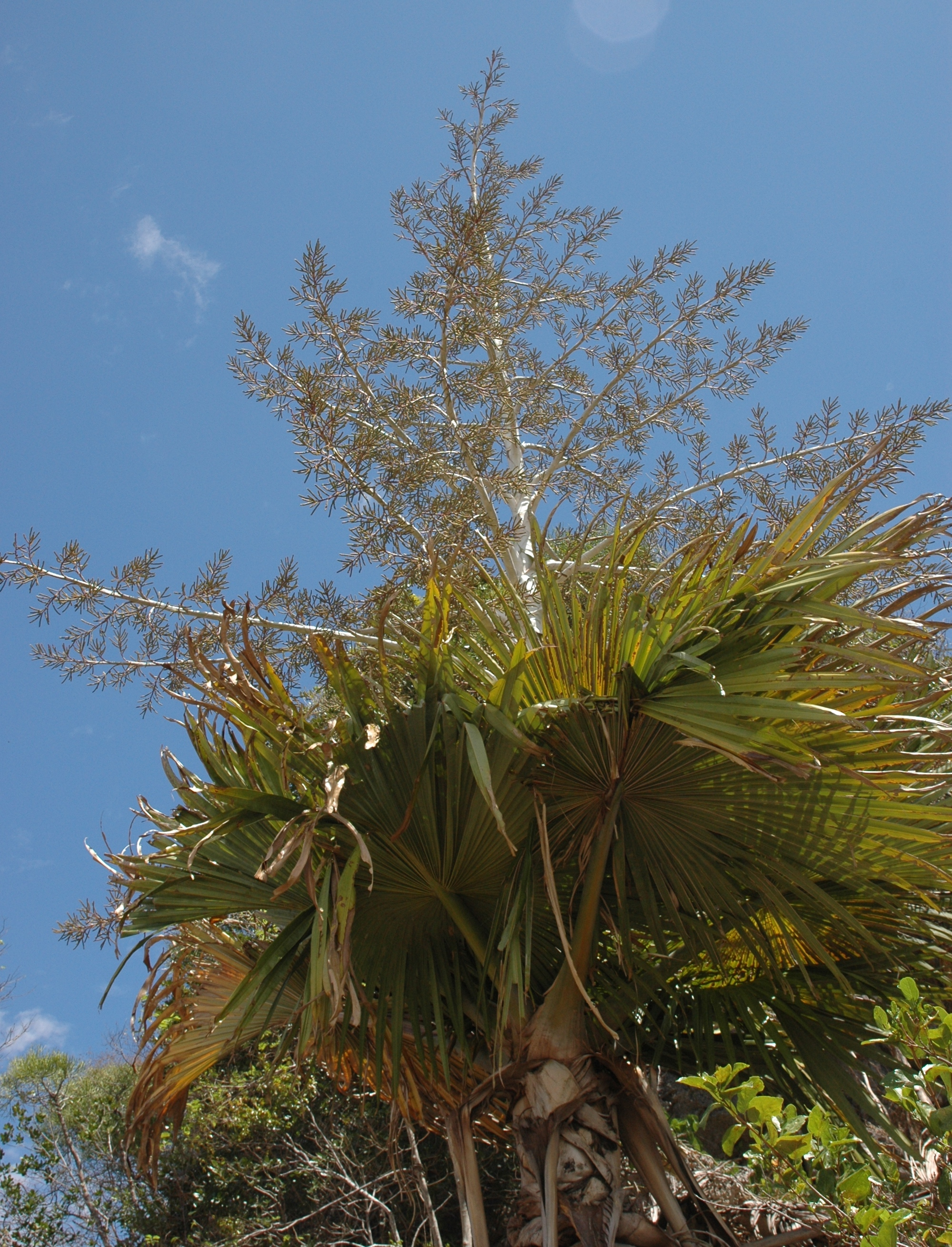

Conservation status
- Critically Endangered (IUCN 3.1)

Scientific classification
- Kingdom: Plantae
- Clade: Tracheophytes
- Clade: Angiosperms
- Clade: Monocots
- Clade: Commelinids
- Order: Arecales
- Family: Arecaceae
- Subfamily: Coryphoideae
- Tribe: Chuniophoeniceae
- Genus: Tahina; J. Dransf. & Rakotoarinivo, 2008
- Species: T. spectabilis

Binomial name
- Tahina spectabilis J. Dransf. & Rakotoarinivo, 2008

= Tahina spectabilis =

Species of palm

Tahina spectabilis, the tahina palm, also called blessed palm or dimaka is a species of gigantic palm (family Arecaceae, or Palmae) that is found only in the Analalava District of northwestern Madagascar where its range is only twelve acres (4.9 hectares), one of the most extreme examples of endemism known. It can grow 18 m (59 ft) tall and has palmate leaves over 5 m (16 ft) across. The trunk is up to 20 in (51 cm) thick, and sculpted with conspicuous leaf scars. An individual tree was discovered when in flower in 2007; it was first described the following year as a result of photographs being sent to Kew Gardens in the United Kingdom for identification. The palm is thought to live for up to fifty years before producing an enormous inflorescence up to 19.5 ft (5.9 m) in height and width, surpassed in size only by Corypha spp. and by Metroxylon salomonense and, being monocarpic, subsequently dying. The inflorescence, a panicle, consists of hundreds, perhaps thousands, of three-flowered clusters which bloom in three consecutive, synchronized "cohorts" or flushes of bloom. The nearest equivalent pattern of flowering is in the flowering vine Bougainvillea where the three flowers bloom sequentially, but not synchronized. Fewer than one hundred adult individuals of the species are thought to exist and the International Union for Conservation of Nature has rated it as "critically endangered".

== Taxonomy ==
The species, which produces countless flowers and (after fruiting) dies, is sufficiently different from other known palms to justify the creation of the monotypic genus Tahina, which is now included with three other genera in the tribe Chuniophoeniceae; the other members being found in the Arabian peninsula, Thailand and China. Fewer than one hundred individuals of the species are thought to exist.

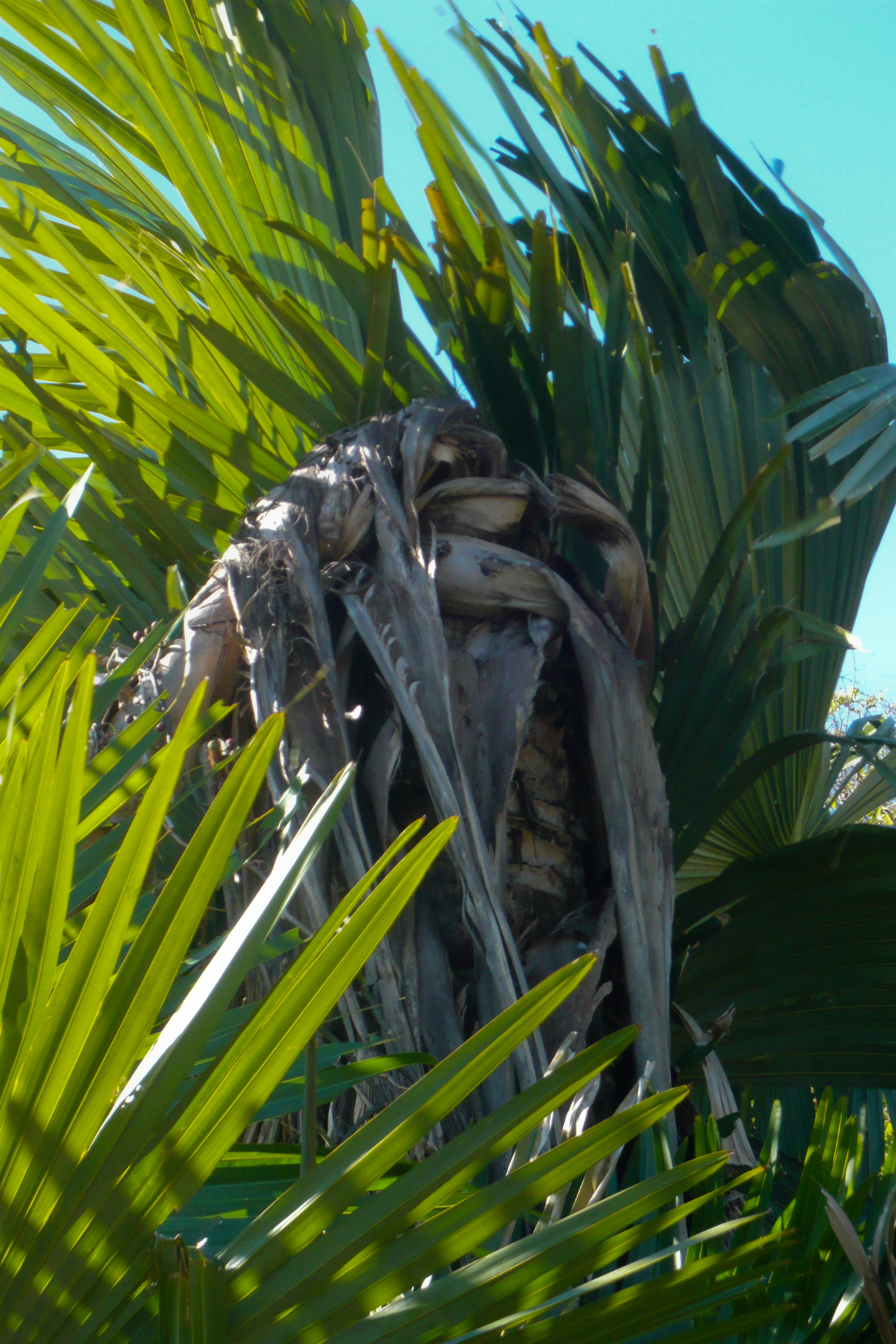
Tahina spectabilis foliage

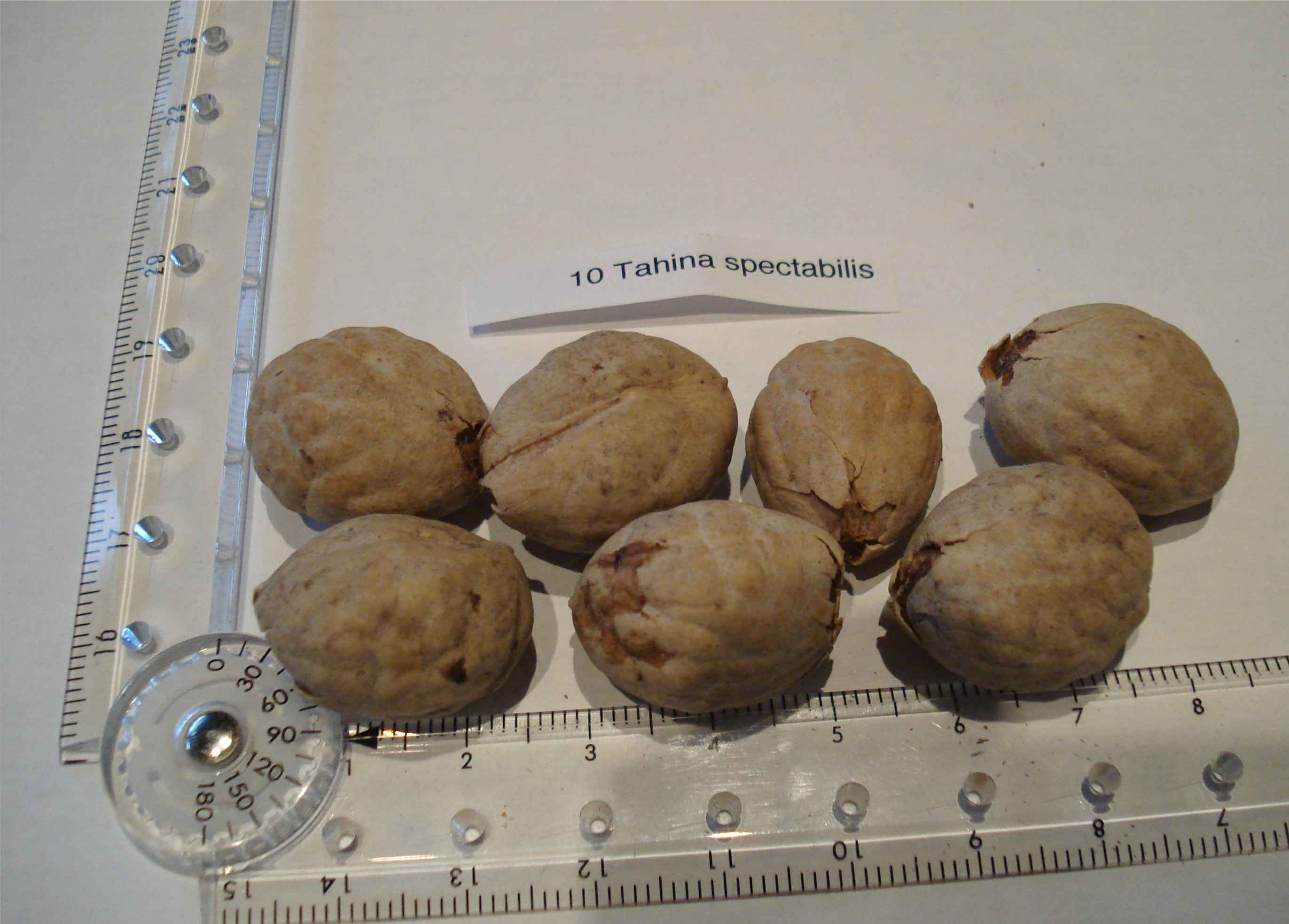
Seeds of Tahina spectabilis, with a ruler for scale

== Description ==
The palm is one of the largest of the 170 palm species native to Madagascar, having a trunk up to 18 m (59 ft) tall and leaves which are over 5 m (16 ft) in diameter.

Tahina spectabilis normally appears much like other palms. However, when it flowers, which John Dransfield of the Royal Botanic Gardens, Kew estimates as occurring after 30 to 50 years, the stem tip grows a large inflorescence that bursts into branches of hundreds of flowers. The drain on nutrients this display entails results in the death of the organism within several months. This leads to the common name for the palm – Suicide Palm.

== Discovery ==
The tahina palm was discovered by French cashew plantation manager Xavier Metz and his family, who were strolling through a remote northwestern region of Madagascar in 2007 when they came across a flowering individual and sent photos to the Kew Gardens for identification.

Its name is derived from "Tahina", a Malagasy word meaning "to be protected" or "blessed", being the given name of Anne-Tahina Metz, the daughter of its discoverer, while "spectabilis" means spectacular in Latin.

It was subsequently chosen as one of the top ten species discoveries of 2008 by the International Institute for Species Exploration.
