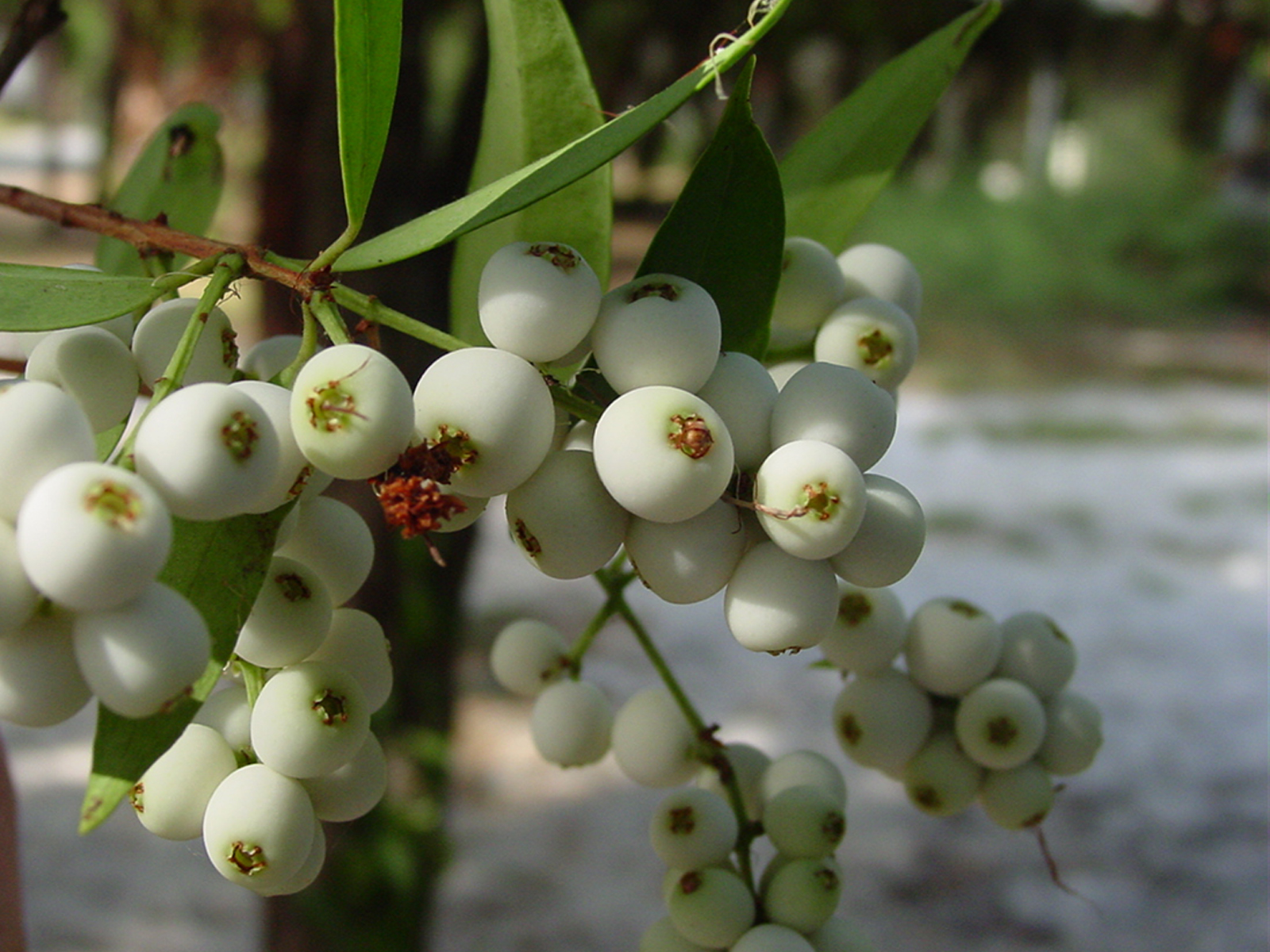

Conservation status
- Least Concern (IUCN 3.1)

Scientific classification
- Kingdom: Plantae
- Clade: Tracheophytes
- Clade: Angiosperms
- Clade: Eudicots
- Clade: Rosids
- Order: Myrtales
- Family: Myrtaceae
- Genus: Syzygium
- Species: S. antisepticum

Binomial name
- Syzygium antisepticum (Blume) Merr. & L.M.Perry

Synonyms
- 15 synonyms: Calyptranthes aromatica Blume; Caryophyllus antisepticus Blume; Eugenia antiseptica (Blume) Kuntze; Jambosa aromatica Miq.; Acmena grata (Wight) Walp.; Eugenia collinsiae Craib; Eugenia cuprea Koord. & Valeton; Eugenia glaucicalyx Merr.; Eugenia grata Wight; Eugenia grata var. nervosa Craib; Myrtus quadrangularis Buch.-Ham. ex Duthie; Syzygium glaucicalyx (Merr.) Merr.; Syzygium gratum (Wight) S.N.Mitra; Syzygium gratum var. confertum Chantar. & J.Parn.; Syzygium ovatifolium Merr. & L.M.Perry

= Syzygium antisepticum =

Species of tree

Syzygium antisepticum, or shore eugenia, is a species of tree native to the floristic regions of Indochina and Malesia.

== Description ==
Syzygium antisepticum is a medium-size tree usually reaching 10–30 m (33–98 ft) tall with a trunk about 10–30 cm (3.9–11.8 in) diameter. Buttresses may or may not be present, and it has a distinctive red flaky bark. New growth is reddish and glabrous. Leaves are glossy dark green on the upper side and paler on the lower side, measure up to 11.5 cm (4.5 in) long and 4 cm (1.6 in) wide, and have a "drip tip" (or acumen) up to 2 cm (0.79 in) long. The flowers are compact in the inflorescence. Fruits are globose (almost spherical), white and about 1 cm (0.4 in) diameter.

== Taxonomy ==
This species was first described in 1828 as Caryophyllus antisepticus by Carl Ludwig Blume. More than a hundred years later, American botanists Elmer Drew Merrill and Lily May Perry transferred it the genus Syzygium. It has been suggested that this species is part of a species complex which also includes S. gratum, S. ovatifolium, and S. zeylanicum.

== Distribution ==
The plant is native to tropical Asia, ranging from Bangladesh and Assam through Indochina to Malesia, including Peninsular Malaysia the islands of Borneo, Java, Sumatra, the Philippines, Sulawesi, and the Lesser Sunda Islands. It inhabits deciduous and evergreen forests, mangrove forests, and savannah, from sea level up to about 1,400 m (4,600 ft) elevation.

== Gallery ==
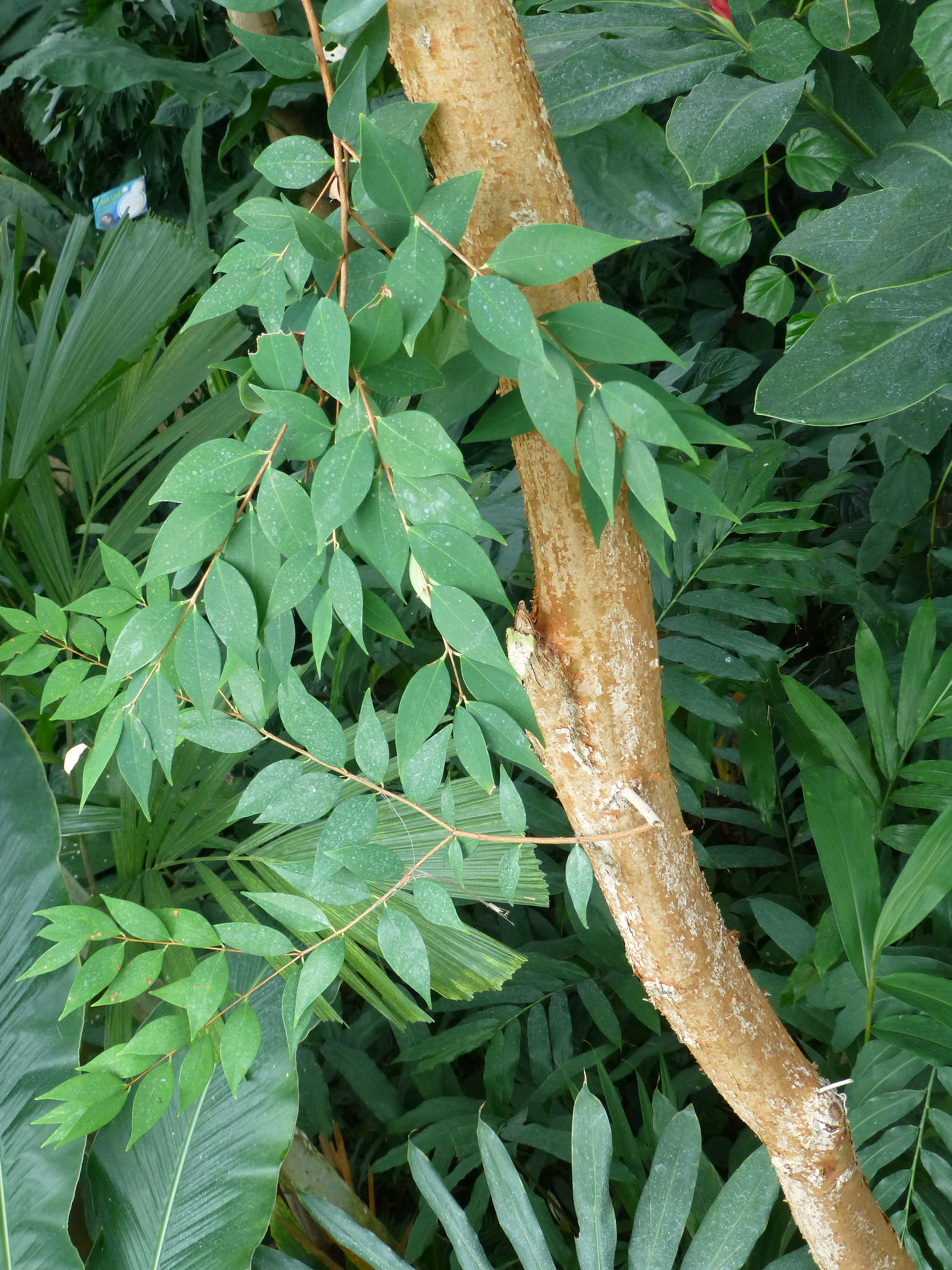
Foliage

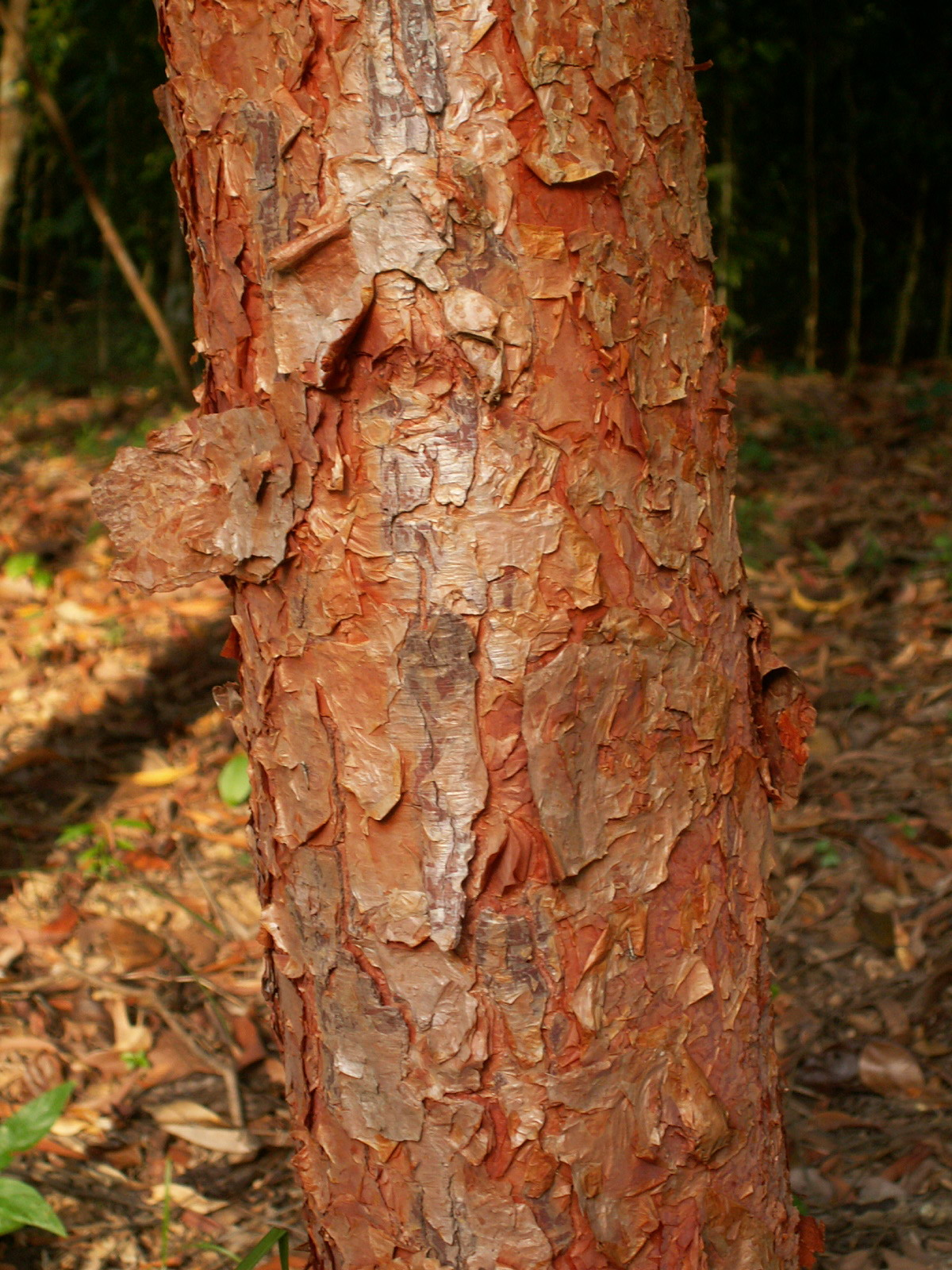
Distinctive red trunk

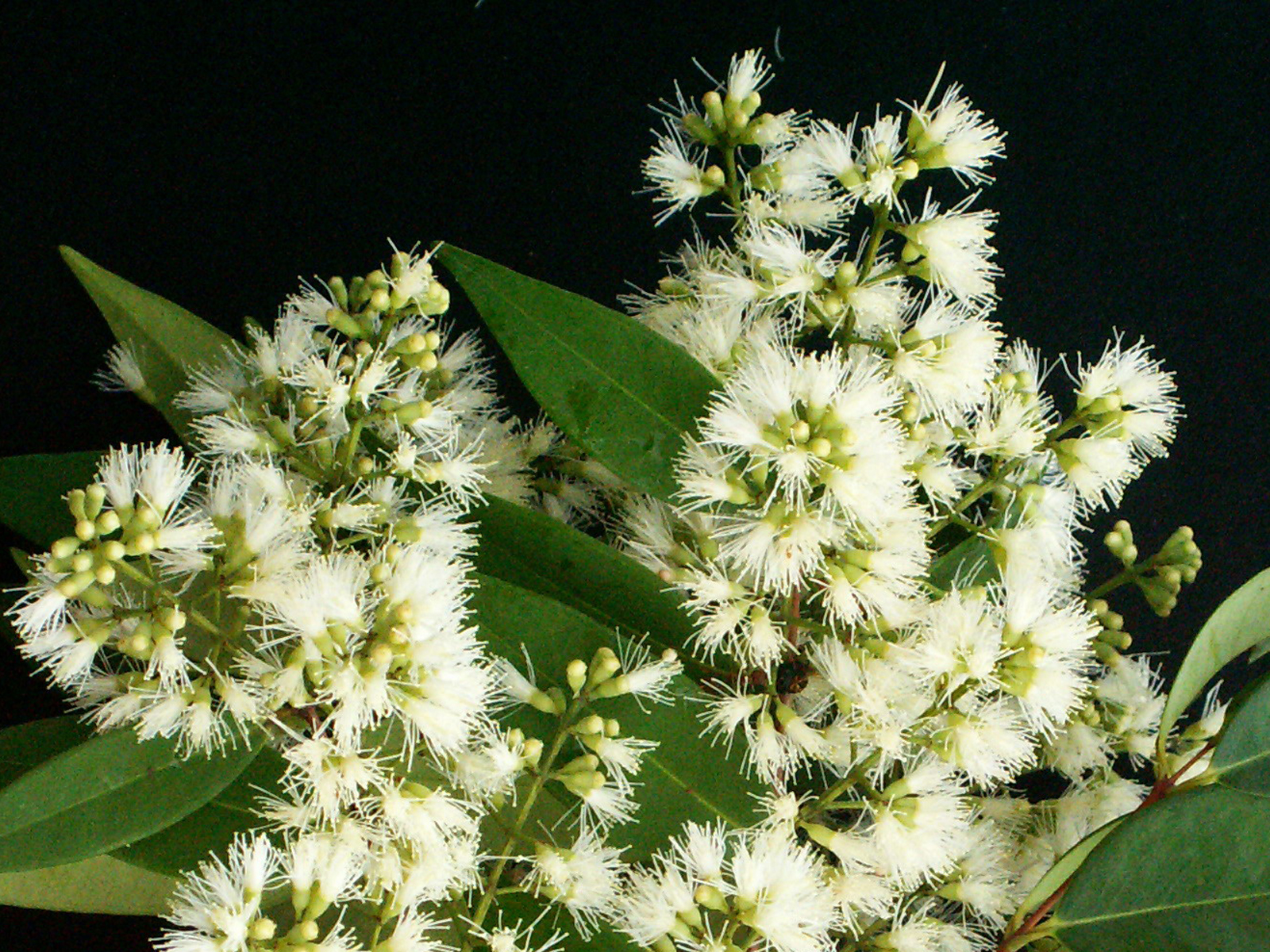
Flowers
