= Nannorrhops =

- Nannorrhops ritchiana in Oman

Scientific classification
- Kingdom: Plantae
- Clade: Tracheophytes
- Clade: Angiosperms
- Clade: Monocots
- Clade: Commelinids
- Order: Arecales
- Family: Arecaceae
- Subfamily: Coryphoideae
- Tribe: Chuniophoeniceae
- Genus: Nannorrhops; H.Wendl.
- Species: N. ritchiana

Binomial name
- Nannorrhops ritchiana (Griff.) Aitch.

Synonyms
- Chamaerops ritchieana Griff.; Nannorrhops naudiniana Becc.; Nannorrhops stocksiana Becc.; Nannorrhops arabica Burret

Species of plant

Nannorrhops ritchiana, the Mazari palm, is the sole species in the genus Nannorrhops in the palm family Arecaceae.

== Distribution ==
It is native to southwestern Asia, from the southeast of the Arabian Peninsula east through Iran and Afghanistan to Pakistan in the historical region of Balochistan, growing at altitudes of up to 1,600 m.

== Description ==
It is a shrub-like clumping palm, with several stems growing from a single base. The stems grow slowly and often tightly together, reaching up to 6 m (20 ft). It is a fan palm (Arecaceae tribe Corypheae), with the leaves 30–60 cm (12–24 in) long, rarely to 130 cm (51 in) long, with a long, smooth (unspined) petiole 15–30 cm (6–12 in) long terminating in a rounded fan 60–90 cm (24–35 in) wide with 8–15 (–40) leaflets, each leaflet 30–38 cm (12–15 in) long, with a distinct glaucous blue-green to grey-green colour.

The flowers are borne in tall, open clusters up to 0.6–1 m (2–3 ft) long at the top of the stems; the flowers are hermaphrodite. The fruit is a brown drupe 0.6–1.8 cm diameter, containing a seed 1.15-1.5 cm long and 1.1-1.5 cm wide. The individual stems are monocarpic, dying back to the ground after flowering, with the plant continuing growth from basal sprouts.

== Cultivation ==
It is one of the hardier palms, tolerating winter frosts down to about −12 °C (10 °F) (possibly even −20 °C or −4 °F), though it requires very hot summers for good growth. It can be grown in USDA zones 6-11. It is occasionally grown as an ornamental plant in southern Europe and southern North America, but is not widely cultivated.
