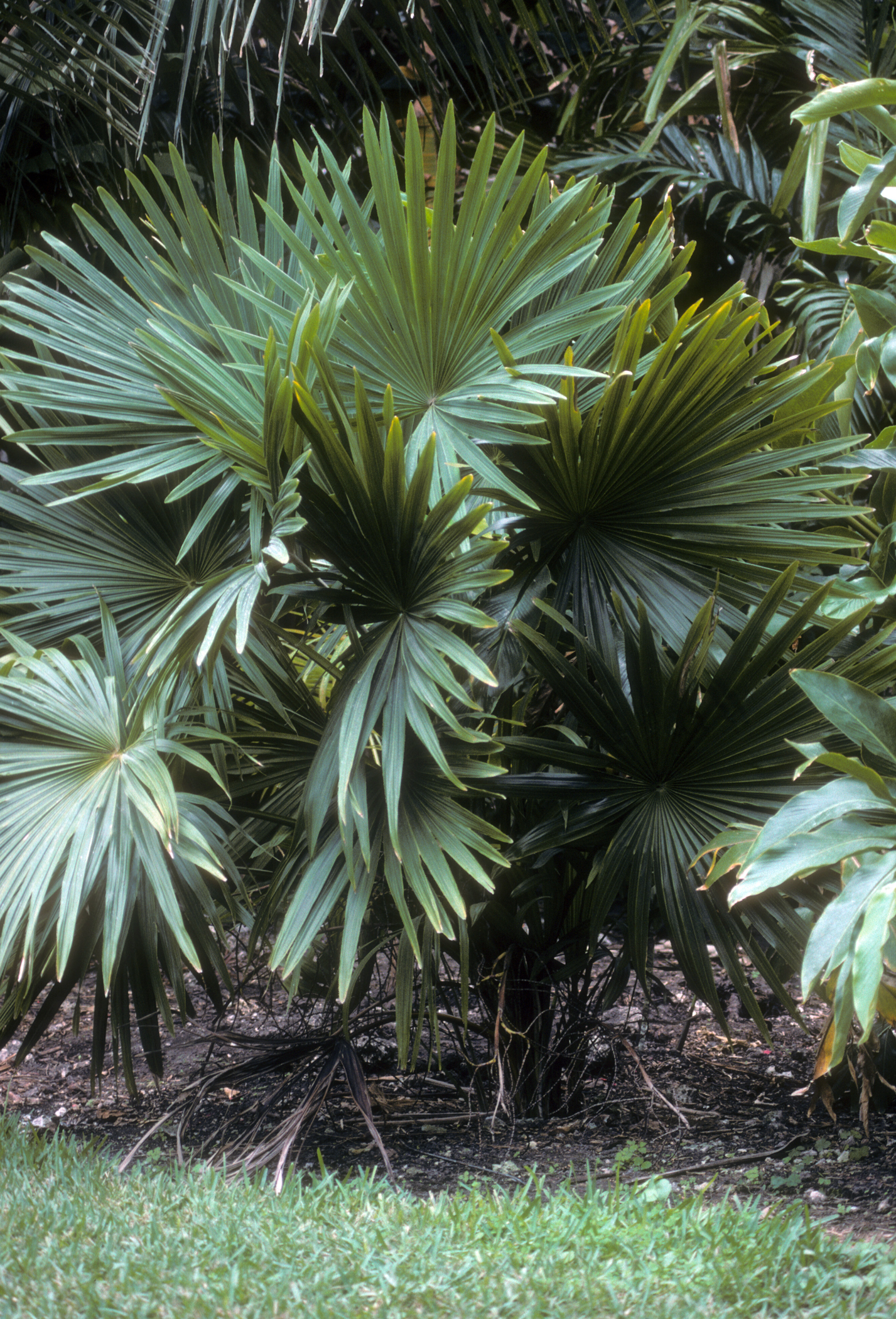

Conservation status
- Endangered (IUCN 3.1)

Scientific classification
- Kingdom: Plantae
- Clade: Tracheophytes
- Clade: Angiosperms
- Clade: Monocots
- Clade: Commelinids
- Order: Arecales
- Family: Arecaceae
- Genus: Chuniophoenix
- Species: C. hainanensis

Binomial name
- Chuniophoenix hainanensis Burret

= Chuniophoenix hainanensis =

Species of palm

Chuniophoenix hainanensis, also known as Hainan fan palm, is a species of palm tree. It is endemic to the island province of Hainan in southern China, where it grows in lowland and montane rain forests.
