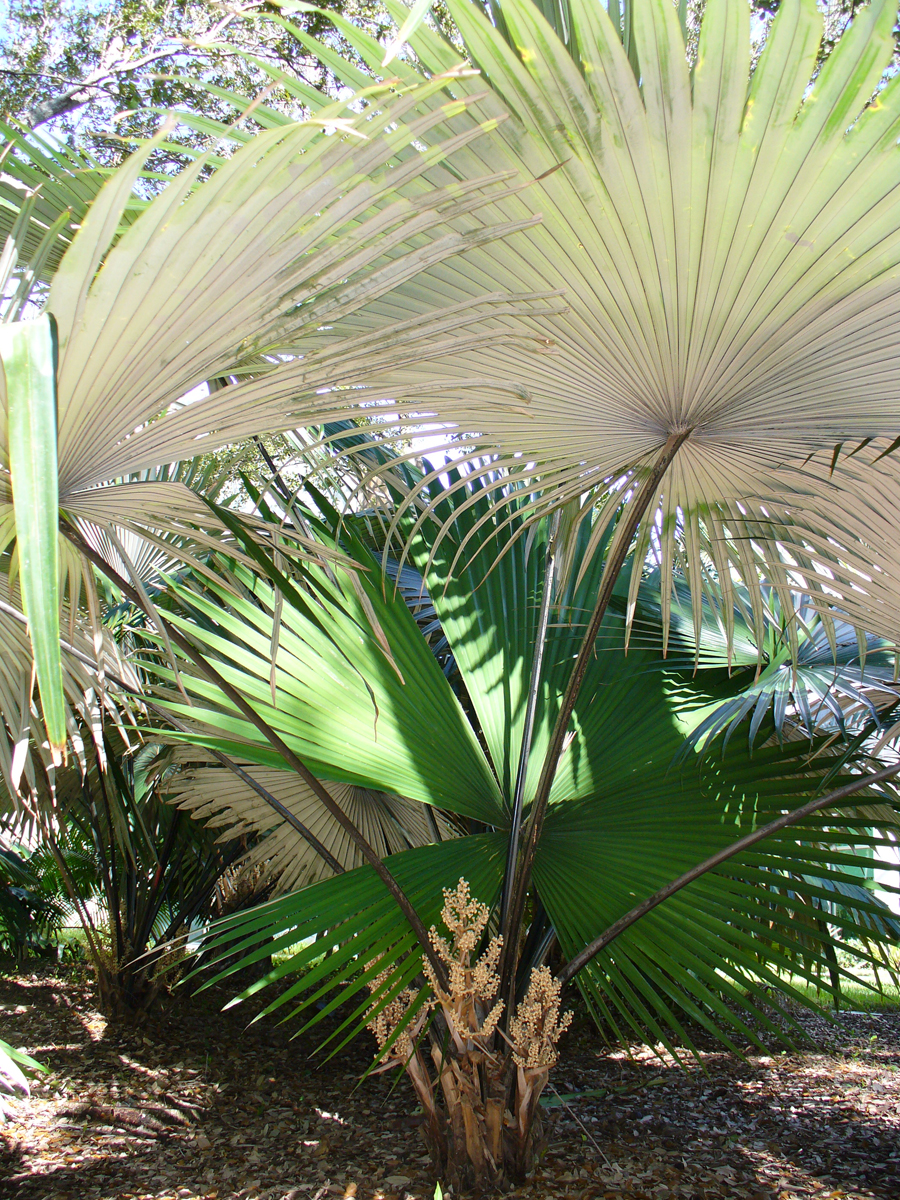

Conservation status
- Endangered (IUCN 3.1)

Scientific classification
- Kingdom: Plantae
- Clade: Tracheophytes
- Clade: Angiosperms
- Clade: Monocots
- Clade: Commelinids
- Order: Arecales
- Family: Arecaceae
- Subfamily: Coryphoideae
- Tribe: Chuniophoeniceae
- Genus: Kerriodoxa; J.Dransf.
- Species: K. elegans

Binomial name
- Kerriodoxa elegans J.Dransf.

= Kerriodoxa =

Genus of palms

Kerriodoxa elegans, the white backed palm, is the only species of palm tree in the genus Kerriodoxa, in the family Arecaceae.

It is an endemic species of Thailand, first discovered in the Khao Phra Thaew reserve on 11 March 1929 and described as a new genus and species in 1983. It is dioecious, with separate male and female plants.

The genus name of Kerriodoxa is in honour of Arthur Francis George Kerr (1877–1942), an Irish medical doctor.
