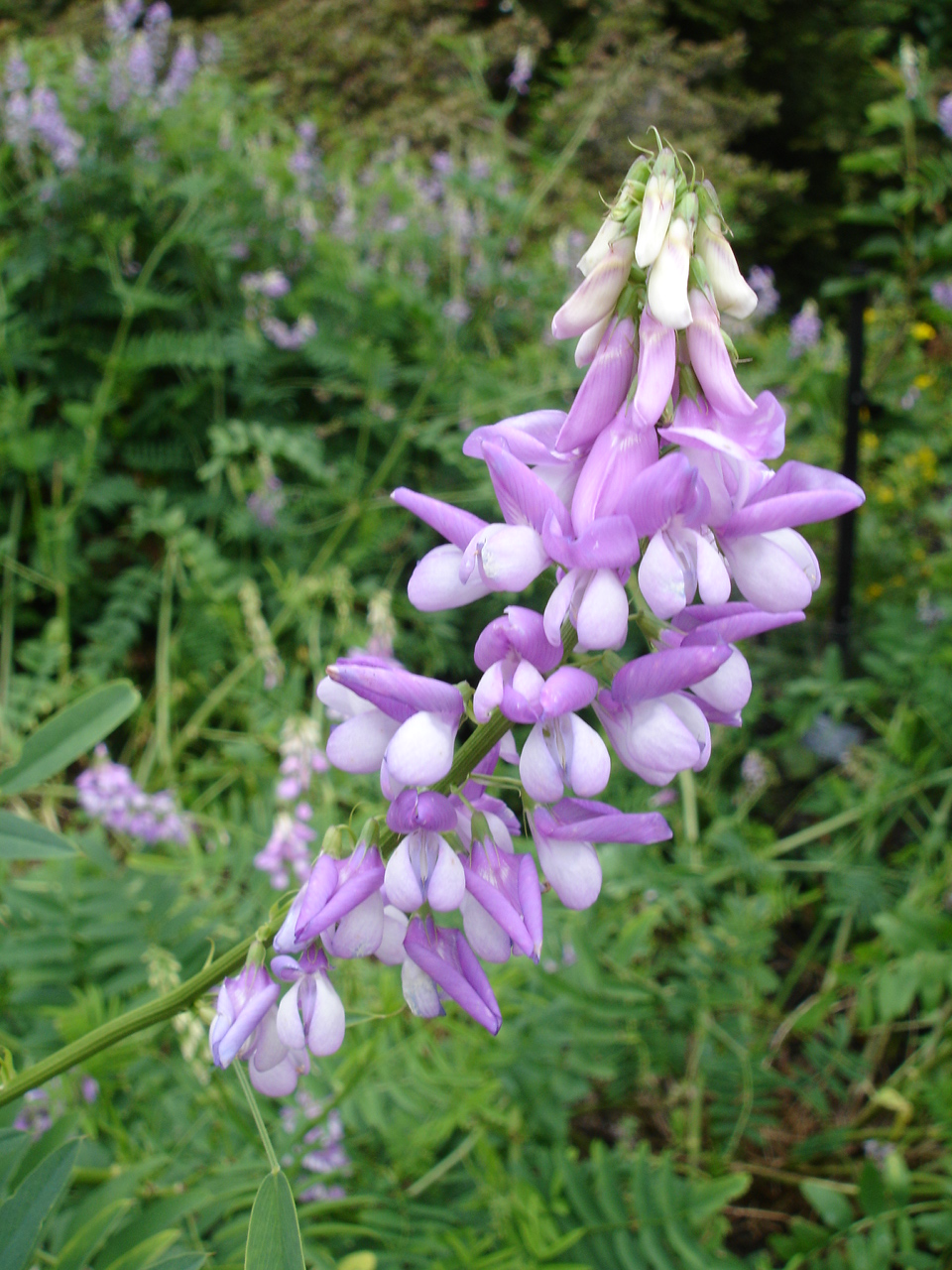
- Galega officinalis

Scientific classification
- Kingdom: Plantae
- Clade: Embryophytes
- Clade: Tracheophytes
- Clade: Angiosperms
- Clade: Eudicots
- Clade: Rosids
- Order: Fabales
- Family: Fabaceae
- Subfamily: Faboideae
- Clade: Meso-Papilionoideae
- Clade: Non-protein amino acid-accumulating clade
- Clade: Hologalegina
- Clade: Inverted repeat-lacking clade
- Tribe: Galegeae (Bronn) Torr. & Gray

Type genus
- Galega L.

Synonyms
- Astragaleae; Coluteae

= Galegeae =

Tribe of leguminous plants

Galegeae is a tribe in the flowering plant family Fabaceae, subfamily Faboideae. The tribe is found mostly in the northern hemisphere, but can also be found in Australia, Africa, and South America. Recent molecular phylogenetic work has determined that tribe Galegeae is paraphyletic, and that its members are scattered throughout the IR-lacking clade.

== Classification ==
The tribe Galegeae contains roughly twenty genera. Indigofereae and Psoraleeae were once included as subtribes, but have since been elevated as distinct tribes.

=== Subtribe Astragalinae ===
Carmichaelinae Clade

- Carmichaelia R. Br.
- Clianthus Sol. ex Lindl.
- Montigena (Hook. f.) Heenan (Note: Possibly synonymous with Swainsona)
- †Streblorrhiza Endl.
- Swainsona Salisb.

Coluteinae Clade

- Astragalus L.
- Biserrula L. (Note: Possibly synonymous with Astragalus)
- Colutea L.
- Eremosparton Fisch. & C.A.Mey.
- Erophaca Boiss.
- Lessertia DC.
- Ophiocarpus (Bunge) Ikonn.
- Phyllolobium Fisch. ex Spreng.
- Podlechiella Maassoumi & Kaz. Osaloo
- Sphaerophysa DC.
- Sutherlandia R.Br. (Note: Possibly synonymous with Lessertia)

Incertae sedis

- Oreophysa (Bunge ex Boiss.) Bornm.
- Oxytropis DC.
- Smirnowia Bunge

=== Subtribe Galeginae ===
- Galega L.

Molecular phylogenetic analysis have found tribe Galegeae to be polyphyletic, with the three subtribes recovered in different part of the inverted repeat-lacking clade.
