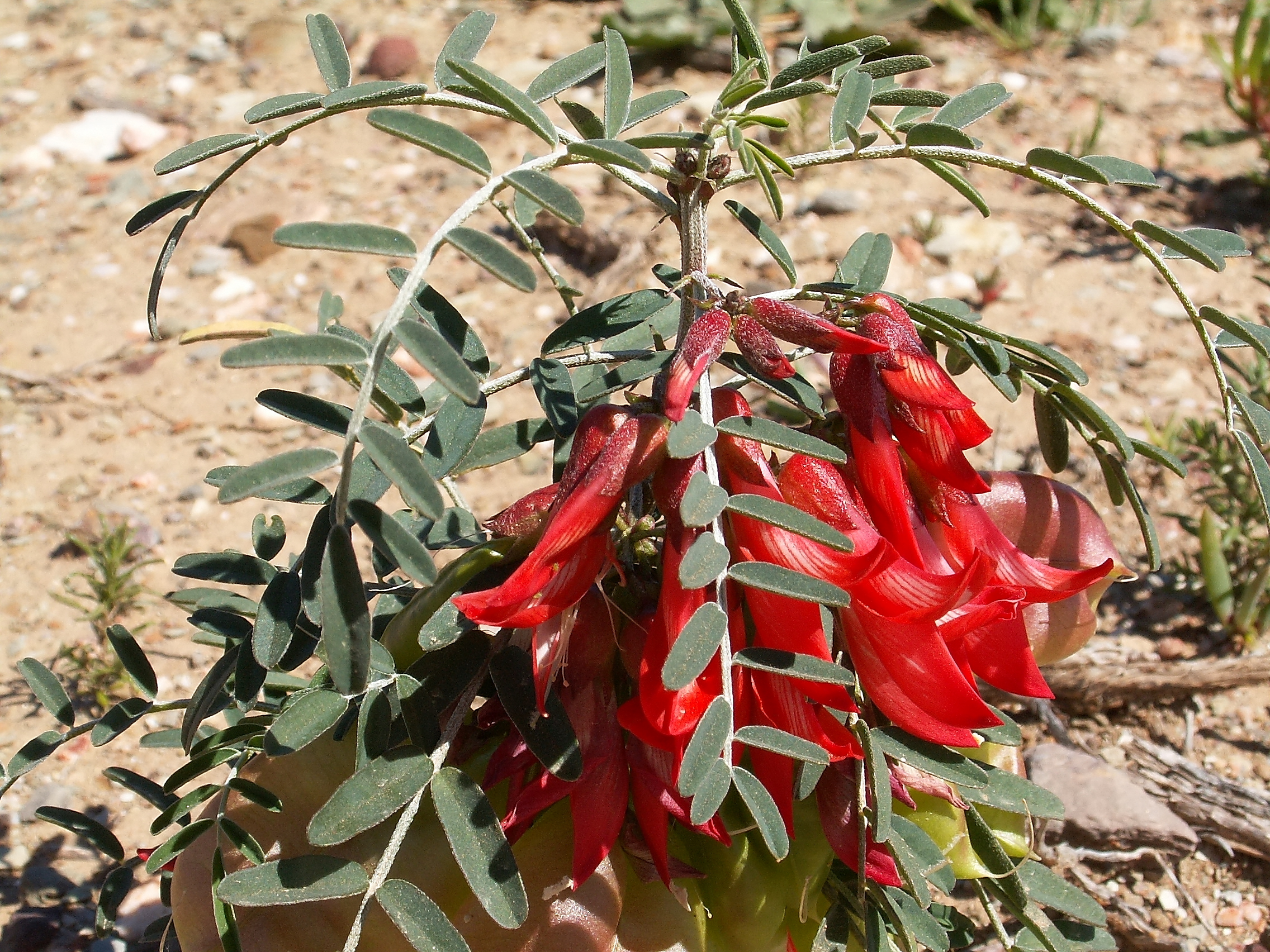
- Sutherlandia frutescens

Scientific classification
- Kingdom: Plantae
- Clade: Tracheophytes
- Clade: Angiosperms
- Clade: Eudicots
- Clade: Rosids
- Order: Fabales
- Family: Fabaceae
- Subfamily: Faboideae
- Clade: Inverted repeat-lacking clade
- Tribe: Galegeae
- Subtribe: Astragalinae
- Genus: Sutherlandia; R.Br.

Species
- See text

= Sutherlandia =

Genus of legumes

Sutherlandia is a genus of flowering plants in the family Fabaceae containing six known living species. The genus was once organized as having a single species, S. frutescens, but later expanded to include more based on morphological characteristics. However, later analysis found more genetic variation between populations than between taxa.

The genus Sutherlandia is sometimes included in the genus Lessertia and it is morphologically and chemically similar to Lessertia, Astragalus, and other genera of the tribe Galegeae.

== Species ==
- Sutherlandia frutescens (L.) R.Br. cancerbush, balloon pea (Australia, Botswana, Kenya, Lesotho, Mauritius, Namibia, South Africa)
- Sutherlandia humilis E.Phillips & R.A.Dyer (South Africa)
- Sutherlandia microphylla Burch (Botswana, Namibia, South Africa)
- Sutherlandia montana E.Phillips & R.A.Dyer (Lesotho, South Africa)
- Sutherlandia speciosa E.Phillips & R.A.Dyer (South Africa)
- Sutherlandia tomentosa Eckl. & Zeyh. (South Africa)
