= Edward Stuart Cardinal Dyke =

South African naturalist and photographer

Edward Stuart Cardinal Dyke (24 August 1872 – 21 January 1915) was a prominent naturalist, photographer, and botanical explorer in South Africa during the late 19th to early 20th century. He associated with the leading botanical lights of the day, including Rudolf Marloth, to whom he donated many specimens and many of the photographs that appeared in Marloth's monumental work, “The Flora of South Africa”. Some plant species were named after him. As a young man he fought in the Second Boer War. In World War I he was one of the first to die in the campaign in South-West Africa.

== Career ==
Edward Dyke's father was a cashier in Cape Government Railways and in that respect Dyke followed in his father's footsteps; he was a railway employee most of his life. At first he was stationed at the Cape and later in the Transvaal. Possibly however, he merely used his salaried employment as means to more adventurous pursuits. Nearly all his spare time, he devoted to camping and mountaineering, and he had fought in the Second Boer War as a young man. Eventually, at the outbreak of the First World War, he enlisted as a Trooper in the Imperial Light Horse Regiment.

== Botanical achievements ==
In his spare time during his working life, he climbed the Cape Peninsula mountains, the Hottentots-Holland mountains, and nearby ranges, all of which are spectacular examples of Fynbos, including Peninsula Granite Fynbos, Peninsula Sandstone Fynbos and a number of related biomes. Later, when the railway administration moved to Johannesburg, he continued his explorations in various parts of the Drakensberg mountains, as well as on visits to Lesotho. On such excursions he collected avidly and sent specimens to Dr Rudolf Marloth. He extended his explorations to other regions as well; for example, while climbing the Cockscomb Mountains in the Winterberg range near Uitenhage he discovered a hitherto unrecognised species of Protea, later named Protea dykei Phill (now seen as a synonym of Protea rupicola). On Matroosberg in the Hex River Mountains, he discovered a new species of "everlasting", flowers that in those days were generally included in the genus Helichrysum. That species was described by Harry Bolus under the name Helichrysum dykei Bolus. The genus has since been split however, and the species has been assigned to another genus, as Syncarpha dykei (Bolus) B. Nord. Dyke's name also appears in the names of Erica dykei L. Bolus (= Erica thodei Gilg) and Lessertia dykei L. Bolus.

Not content with discovering and documenting plant life, Dyke also grew an extensive collection of Karoo plants in his own garden.

== Death and contemporary assessment ==
While on patrol in Walvis Bay he was mortally wounded and died shortly afterwards on 21 January 1915, aged 42, one of the first victims of the campaign in South West Africa.

Dr Marloth, in his obituary for the Mountain Club Journal, mentions the last delivery he received from Dyke: 50 species of plants collected during a week of camping on Mont-Aux-Sources. Marloth considered Dyke's landscape and botanical photography among the best to date, and published many examples in his Flora of South Africa (1913-1915).
