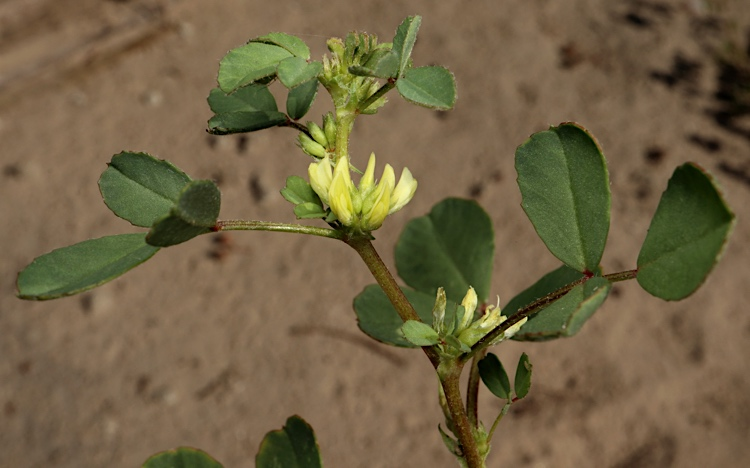

Scientific classification
- Kingdom: Plantae
- Clade: Embryophytes
- Clade: Tracheophytes
- Clade: Angiosperms
- Clade: Eudicots
- Clade: Rosids
- Order: Fabales
- Family: Fabaceae
- Subfamily: Faboideae
- Genus: Trigonella
- Species: T. suavissima

Binomial name
- Trigonella suavissima Lindl.

= Trigonella suavissima =

Species of plant

Trigonella suavissima is a herbaceous plant that is endemic to Australia. It is a member of the genus Trigonella and the family Fabaceae. Common names include Cooper clover, Menindee clover, calomba, Darling trigonella, sweet fenugreek, channel clover, sweet-scented clover and Australian shamrock.

The species was formally described by English botanist John Lindley, based on plant material collected during an expedition by Thomas Mitchell.

== Description ==
Trigonella suavissima is a kind of native annual or ephemeral legume found in Australia. It belongs to the tribe Trifolieae and the Fabaceae family. It was grown and harvested by Australian Aboriginals. It was documented by Mitchell in 1838. The species is ephemeral and mainly grows along the arid interior regions in Australia. The herb grows either decumbently or ascendingly with 5–50 cm long stems and 2–5 cm petioles. The upper surfaces of leaflets are nearly hairless yet the lower surfaces are usually hairy, with 4.5–6.5 mm yellow corolla on top.

Autumn to Spring are the peak seasons of the growth of Trigonella suavissima. Its highest number of occurrences throughout a year takes place in August to September. The species has been gradually increasing in number since 1850, it kept surging since 1955 and it peaked in 1990 and then started sharply declining up until now.

== Distribution ==
Trigonella suavissima is endemic to Australia and can be found in all the Australian states except Tasmania, which has a rather wet climate compared with the other seven states. The species grows in drier regions in the north-west parts of each state.

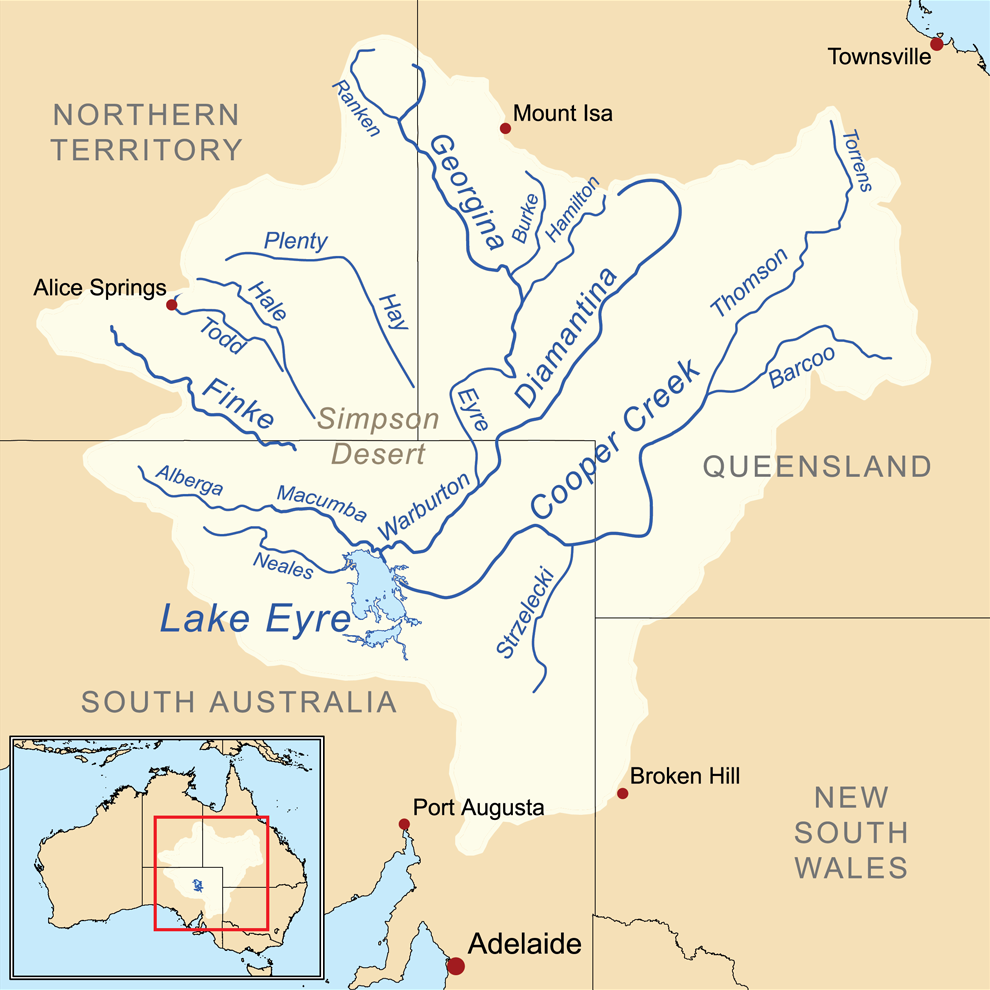
Location of Lake Eyre on the Australian map

The distribution of Trigonella suavissima is related to soil. It is best adapted to clay soils of a fine texture and with self-mulching surfaces. The species is also widespread on soils with a high moisture-holding capacity because of the arid environment and are rarely found in sand soils. It is frequently found in inland arid environments in central Australia, as there are river banks with heavy-clay soils. It relies on highly inundated soil, predominantly in river banks, low-lying depressions and flooded areas. Therefore, the Channel Country near Lake Eyre in Queensland, Brancannia Basin in New South Wales and the Darling Basins in east south Australia which are all middle to low reaches of inland river systems are popular breeding places of Trigonella suavissima.

== Morphology ==
Trigonella suavissima is one of the fastest-flowering species and has the longest flowering period among other legumes. It took 74 days before the first flowering and each flowering usually lasts between 111 and 118 days, showing a low level of fecundity despite having a high potential due to its desirable growth habits. It has the smallest and lightest seeds of around 1.00 mg yet the largest amount of seeds per plant. The seeds of Trigonella suavissima are hard and they imbibe slowly.

Trigonella suavissima is pollinated by insects even though its self-compatibility is still unknown, the fruits are able to fall off plants when it is mature even though the species is usually indehiscent or merely tardily dehiscent.

Trigonella suavissima has the highest protein content (373 g kg−1 DW) among other Australian native legumes. It is a nitrogen-fixing component for native forbs and grasses in the ecosystem after floodings in the basins. The species is also highly tolerant to salinity, being able to develop a 106% of growth even under the control settings of 45 nM sodium chloride concentration.

== Taxonomy ==
Trigonella suavissima belongs in the Falcatulae section of the genus Trigonella according to its morphological characteristics of the embryos and seedlings in cotyledonary leaves and the first propyl leaf stages. The species is consistently categorised as part of the Falcatulae section throughout studies carried out in 1928, 1932, 1989 and 2016 by different scientists.

=== Falcatulae ===
Section Falcatulae is divided into subsections Leves, which refers to smooth seeds and Tuberculatae which means tuberculate seeds and Trigonella suavissima is placed in the former group. The species is under the Anguinae series within the Leves subsection because of the plicated linear legumes.

Falcatulae is a paraphyletic section. The clade consists of Trigonella maritima, Trigonella stellata and Trigonella suavissima, which is strongly supported with a bootstrap value of 95% and a decay value of 4, is related to another strongly supported cluster comprising the remaining two representatives of the section Trigonella balansae and Trigonella anguina, having 95% bootstrap value and the decay value of 4. The species of the clades also share morphological features including the umbellate inflorescence synapomorphic, and the clade provides strong support to its sister group with Trigonella arabica and Trigonella schlumbergeri which belongs in the Pectinatae section. The formation of strongly supported clade indicates that the species share a common ancestral linkage despite having various legume characteristics.

=== Alternate classification ===
It is recently proposed that the series Anguinae should no longer be recognised and Trigonella suavissima should be placed in the Stellatae series instead. The changes are due to the findings in the phylogenetic relationship and morphological similarities between Trigonella suavissima with Trigonella maritima and Trigonella stella.

== Growth ==
=== Propagation ===
The seeds of Trigonella suavissima usually start germinating after soaking in warm water for 12 hours. The species requires general flooding for the inducement of germination in the wild therefore it grows better after autumn and winter flooding. Propagation of Trigonella suavissima is prevalent in inland areas of Australia after winter-spring rains and cool-seasons floods, where dense swards are formed on the flood plains.

=== Stages of growth ===
During the seedling stage, the embryo of Trigonella suavissima consists of cotyledons, radicle and mucilage. The embryo is orange in colour, with a rounded base and an oblong-shaped cotyledon connected to the conical radicle.

When leaves start to grow, the colour of the ovate hypocotyl turns creamy, and grows to the length between 22 and 24 mm, and the leaves are obtused.

Then in the first prophyl leaf stage, the petiole, which is similar to the stem, grows to 15–20 mm and has a hairy surface. The blade leaves around 6–8 mm long and 4–6 mm wide turn into ovate shape.

== Ecological relationship with other species ==
Trigonella suavissima does not only have an exclusive symbiotic relationship with the root-nodule bacteria Sinorhizobium sp., it also shares the nitrogen-fixing ability with Medicago sativa and Trigonella arabica.

A Sinorhizobium strain from Menindee soil does not only fix Nitrogen with Trigonella suavissima but also Medicago sativa while Trigonella arabica and Trigonella suavissima both fix Nitrogen with the CC2281e strain that was isolated from Trigonella arabica.

A minor proportion of Trigonella suavissima was seasonally prolific on the bed of the ephemeral Lake Tandou near Menindee where the stands of Medicago sativa used to be grown. It is deduced that the rhizobia that is responsible for nodulating and fixing Nitrogen with Medicago sativa came from Trigonella suavissima.

=== Associated root-nodule bacteria ===
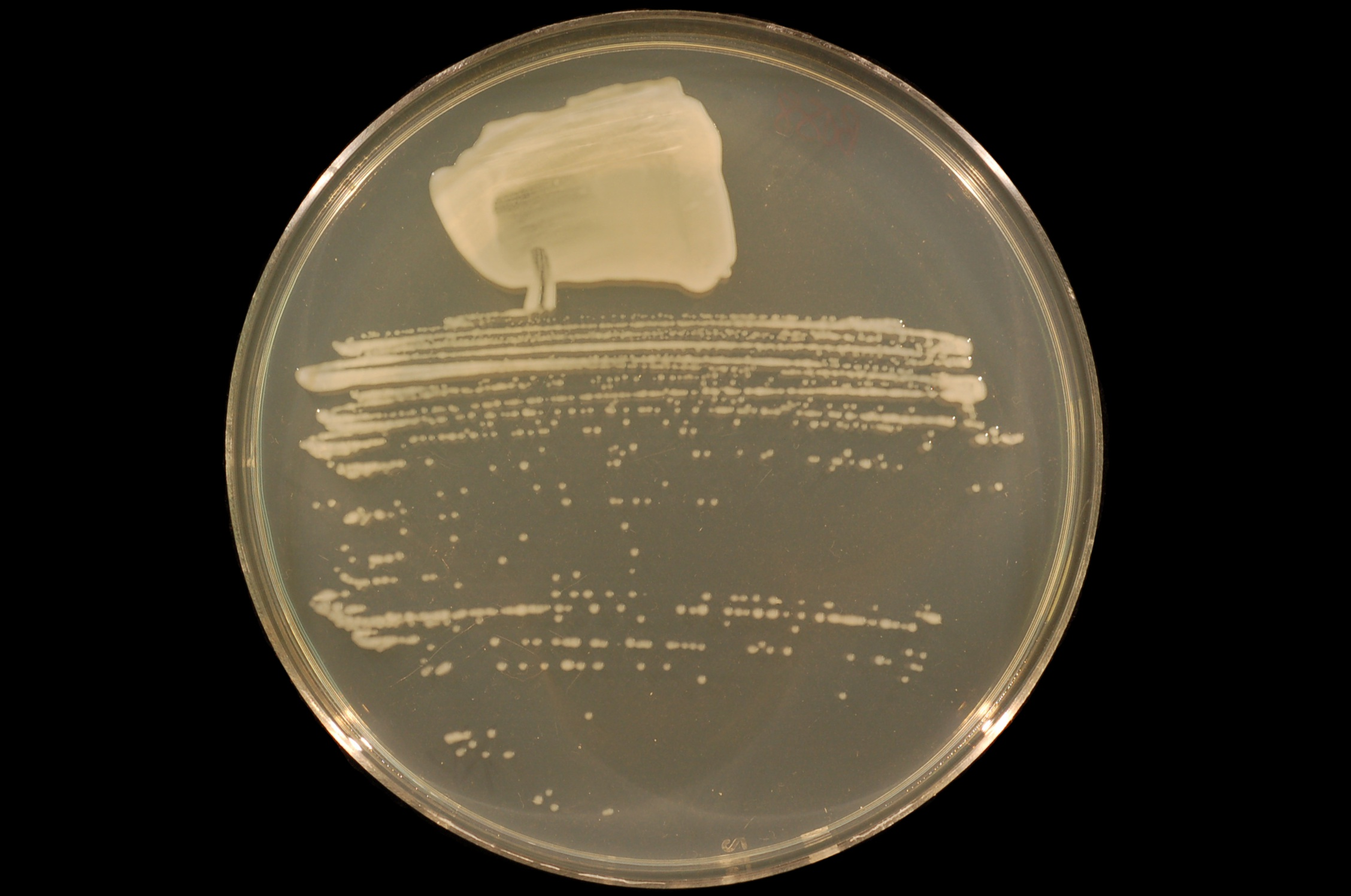
An image of Sinorhizobium under microscope

Sinorhizobium sp. is Trigonella suavissima's homologous root-nodule bacteria. It is also the only Australian native species within its taxonomic group. Sinorhizobium usually inhabits locations with fine-textured clay soil, which is similar to its host plant Trigonella suavissima. The abundance of the species is correlative to the density of Sinorhizobium, the more abundant Trigonella suavissima is found in an area, the more dense Sinorhizobium is found. The presence of Sinorhizobium does not absolutely rely on its host, it is found on a number of both drought and non-drought sites where Trigonella suavissima was not spotted which proves the persistence of Sinorhizobium in soil. This is due to the development of clay envelopes around the bacterial cells which have the capacity to modify the response of the bacteria to the environment, allowing Sinorhizobium to better adapt to the soil. Beside, the bacteria consists of acid-producing strains which combine with the fine structure of the clay component of the soil to facilitate the absorption of clay by the bacteria.

=== Relationship with Trigonella anguina ===
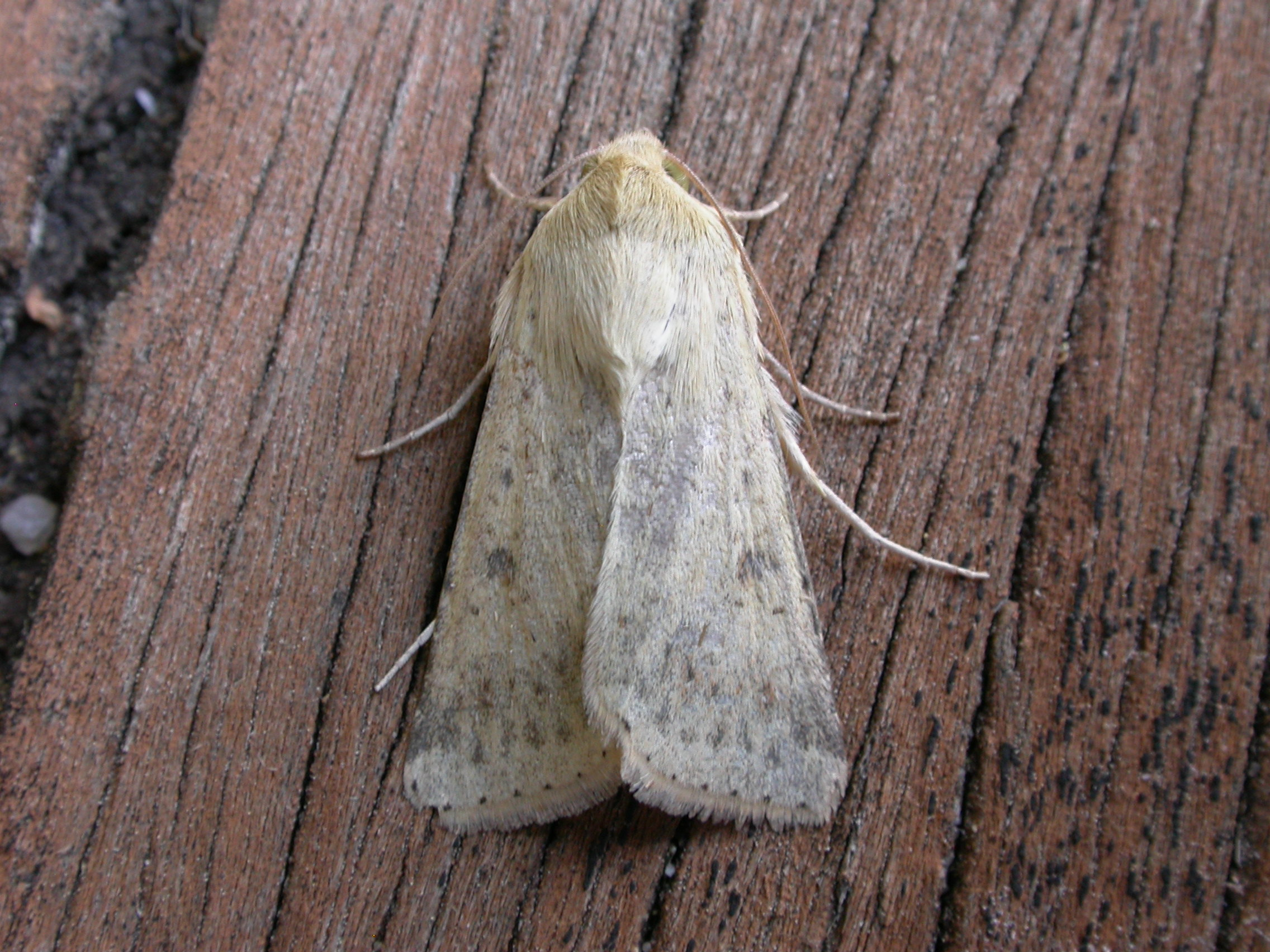
Helicoverpa punctigera

Trigonella suavissima is described as a "sister" to Trigonella anguina as both of them possess oblong cotyledons with rounded bases. They also have accumbent, oval radicles, ovate cotyledonary leaves with obtuse apex and glabrous prophyl leaves with hairy petiole. The two species are not placed in the same section Falcatulae because of several differences. Trigonella anguina possesses an ascending to erect shrubby habit and a hardened stem at its base while Trigonella suavissima has an ascending to prostrate herbaceous habit. They also have distinct geological distributions, where Trigonella suavissima is endemic to Australia and are mainly located in salty and grassy plains in semi-arid areas of interior Australia, Trigonella anguina is mainly found in semi-desert and desert regions in South Africa and is best adapted in soils with high clay content.

=== Pests ===
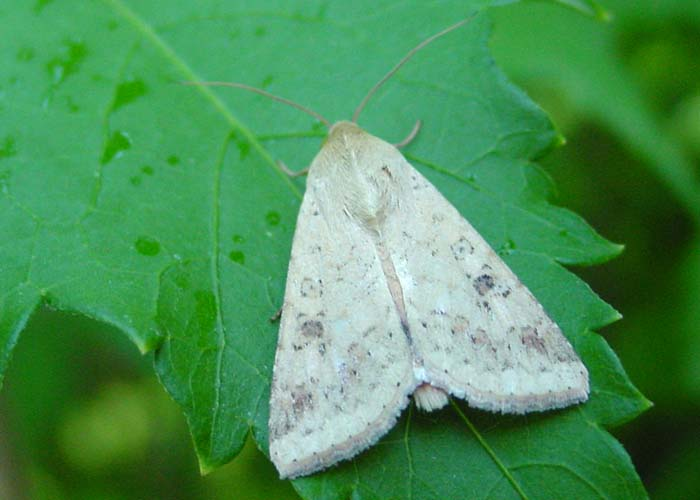
Helicoverpa armigera

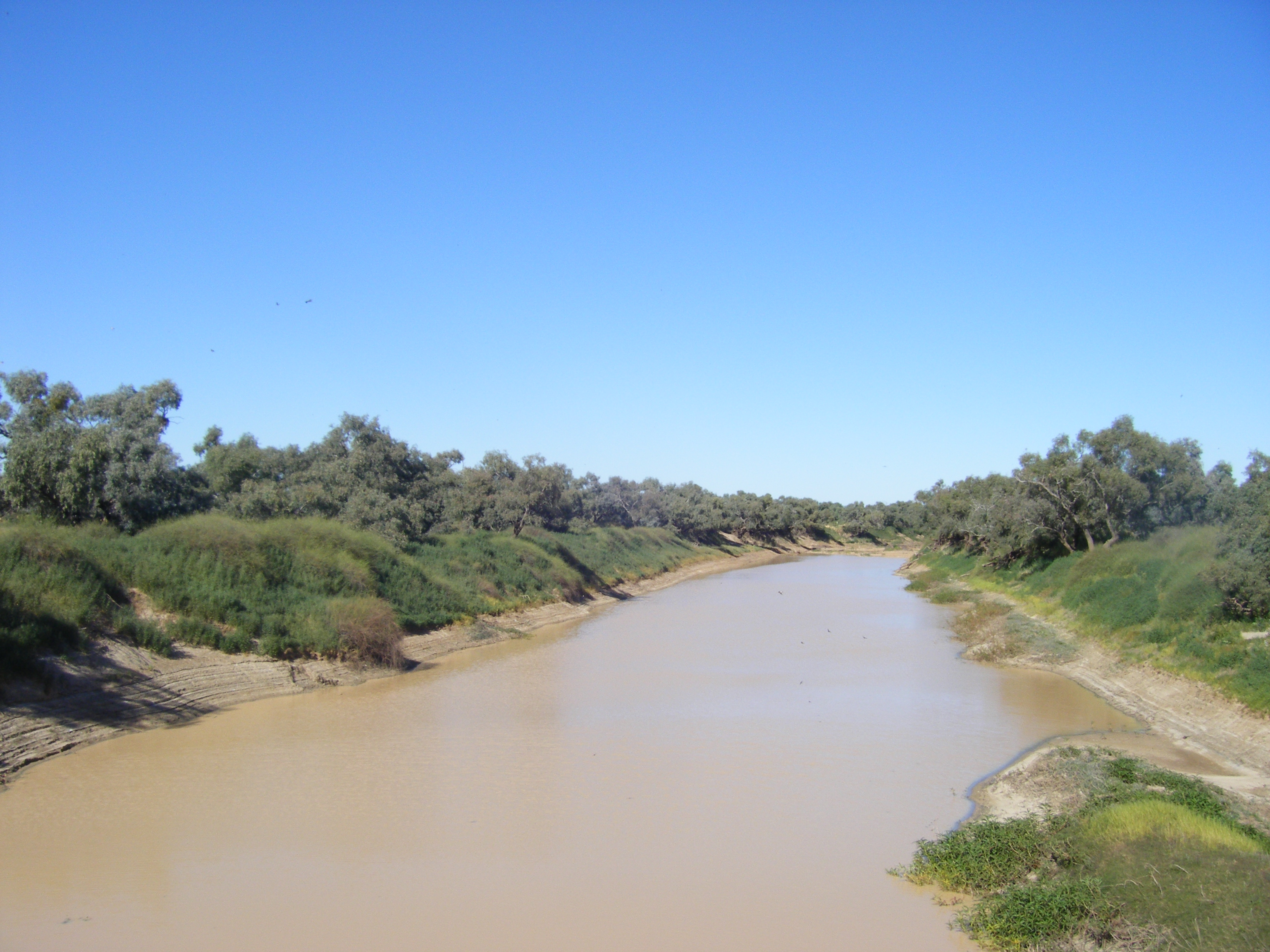
Diamantina River in Queensland, Australia

Trigonella suavissima is a host plant to Helicoverpa punctigera and Helicoverpa armigera, which are major pests of cotton, grain legumes, oilseed, etc. The pests share some common habitats with Trigonella suavissima in Australia, including the Diamantina River, Darling Basin and the Lake Eyre basin. However, Trigonella suavissima is not a significant host plant to the two pests. The host status of the species was graded as "poor" due to the low relative incidence of less than 0.5 of the species in floodplains where Trigonella suavissima is found.

== Uses ==
The major consumers of Trigonella suavissima are the Aboriginals, which they called Galuuba. Facilitating engagement through strong relationships between primary healthcare and Aboriginal and Torres Strait Islander peoples. However, it was recorded that Trigonella suavissima was eaten raw by the people in Diamantina in Queensland, Australia. Experts also found that besides toxic compounds, the species also contain various secondary compounds such as saponins and flavonols that have medical uses. It cannot replace current grain legumes like Cicer arietinum i.e. chickpeas, Lupinus angustifolius i.e. blue lupins and Pisum sativum i.e. peas, Trigonella suavissima is still a viable option as a substitute when the harvest of the grain crops are unsustainable under arid climate and infertile soil.

Trigonella suavissima has a close relationship with other grain legume crops over the world. As it grows in dry areas with limited water and infertile soil, it acts as a resource for foreign legume breeders to improve adaptation of their plants to adverse climate and environment.

=== Agriculture ===
Trigonella suavissima shows a low resistance to legume-feeding pests especially for bluegreen aphids (BGA) and spotted alfafa aphids (SAA), high scores of damages are done to the species by the aphids. The planting of the species should be timed to prevent the early-season warm temperature from promoting attacks from SAA, as Trigonella suavissima is most susceptible to SAA at warm temperatures.

==== Grain crops ====
It is found that Trigonella suavissima is highly suitable to be domesticated as grain crops after studying its adaptation to arid and semi-arid environments with winter-dominant infertile soil, growth habit, pod indelhiscience, anti-nutritional toxins etc. However, the species has not yet been adapted as grain crops because of its unknown properties and the limitation of a small seed size. It has great potential because of its suitable growth habit and other desirable agronomic attributes. Its distribution and growing environment allow the species to avoid water stress. Similar to other members of the Trigonella genus such as Trigonella fremum-graecum, Trigonella suavissima is very likely to possess chemical and pharmaceutical values.

=== Forage ===
Apart from the Aboriginals, Trigonella suavissima has also been used as a forage plant for feeding cattles, especially cows in Australia, for more than 150 years. The species is a vital and prominent component of the forage as green feed and standing dry hay because of its prolific growth after periodic floodings, contributing to the $200 million worth annual profit of the beef industry of the Channel Country of Australia, especially the cattle-fattening enterprises. Trigonella suavissima possesses foliages that contain more than 20% of protein, which is greatly higher than other associated native forage species and native legumes such as Psoralea cinera Lindl. The high concentration of protein is the result of the effective Nitrogen fixation of the symbiosis of Trigonella suavissima. There is not any attempt to domesticate Trigonella suavissima despite having high productivity and economic value. This is partly attributed to the presence of adverse phenological and anti-nutritive traits that undermines its value as fodder.
