= Blue Ox =

The term "Blue Ox" may refer to:

- Babe the blue ox, a legendary ox owned by Paul Bunyan

== See also ==
- Parochetus, a plant known as blue oxalis
