= Swainson pea =

Swainson pea most commonly refers to many species in the genus Swainsona often stylized as Swainson-pea.

However, Swainson pea can also include:

- Sphaerophysa salsula, which is commonly known as the alkali swainsonpea
