= Photosensitivity in animals =

Skin reaction to sunlight exposure

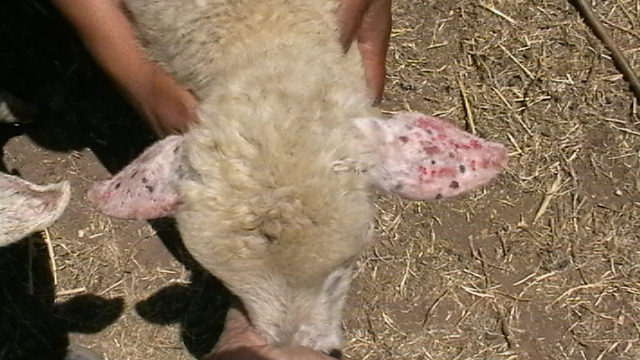
Photosensitization to Hypericum tomentosum in a lamb: healing lesions on the upper face of ears

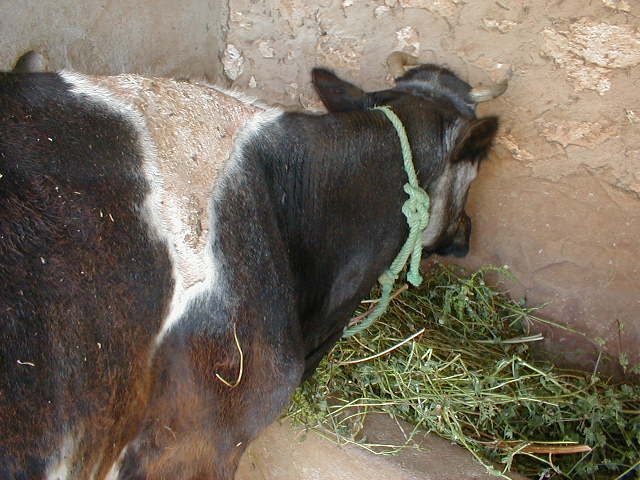
Photosensitization in a Friesian cow (unknown aetiology): lesions limited to white skin.

Photosensitivity is an abnormal skin reaction to direct sunlight exposure. It is unrelated to a sunburn. These reactions are due to photosensitization, the accumulation of photosensitive compounds beneath the skin. In some cases, the photodynamic substances come from ingested plants or drugs, after being metabolized or not. In other cases, the photodynamic substances may be produced in the body itself due to inborn errors in pigment metabolism, especially those involving the heme synthesis. Photosensitivity reactions are usually seen in herbivorous or omnivorous animals, though such reactions are known among carnivores.

== Effects of photosensitivity ==
Photosensitivity reactions are characterized by severe inflammation of the skin with depigmentation and ulceration. In some cases (Type I), pigments are excreted through urine or deposited in hard tissues such as bones and teeth, causing discolouration. Affected animals should be protected from direct sunlight until the photodynamic compounds have been completely eliminated from the body or the appropriate treatments have been given.

== Biological mechanism of photosensitivity reactions ==
Photodynamic compounds are activated by sunlight, which excites them to a higher energy state. They immediately release the excess energy and transfer it to the surrounding acceptor molecules, such as enzymes or free radicals. These molecules are thus activated and cause the skin reaction.

== Classification of photosensitivity reactions ==
Photosensitivity reactions are classified by origin into four types: Type I, Type II, Type III and Type IV.

=== Type I Photosensitivity ===
Type I Photosensitivity occurs when the photodynamic compounds need not undergo metabolism to be activated and so may accumulate under the skin directly following ingestion. Examples of plants producing Type I Photosensitivity include biserrula (Biserrula pelecinus), Buckwheat and St John's wort (Hypericum perforatum). Certain drugs such as phenothiazine or its derivatives may also lead to photosensitivity reactions, commonly in sheep. Phenothiazine is converted by the body into the photodynamic compound phenothiazine sulfoxide.

=== Type II Photosensitivity ===
Type II Photosensitivity is caused by inborn errors in the metabolism of certain biological pigments. In the absence of some key metabolic enzymes, the products of intermediary metabolism accumulate. They are either eliminated through the urine and body fluids or are deposited in some body tissue, such as bone and teeth. A common condition seen in animals is congenital porphyria due to the accumulation of Uroporphyrin, which is deposited in the teeth and bones, giving them a pink discolouration, or excreted through the urine, exhibiting a pinkish fluorescence under ultraviolet light.

=== Type III Photosensitivity ===
Type III (aka hepatic photosensitivity) is the most common type of photosensitivity reaction seen in animals. In this type, the photodynamic substance is phylloerythrin, a derivative of chlorophyll produced in the body. Normally, phylloerythrin is secreted into the intestine by the biliary system and excreted through the feces. In Type III Photosensitivity, damage to the biliary transport mechanism prevents the excretion of phylloerythrin, allowing the photodynamic substance to enter the circulatory system and accumulate under the skin. This condition is exacerbated by the presence of hepatic parasites.

=== Type IV Photosensitivity ===
Type IV Photosensitivity occurs following the ingestion of certain plants, such as alfalfa. The reason is obscure or idiopathic.

== Treatment ==
Affected animals should be transferred to shade. To overcome shock, corticosteroid therapy and fluid infusions may be tried. Antihistamines are also useful.
