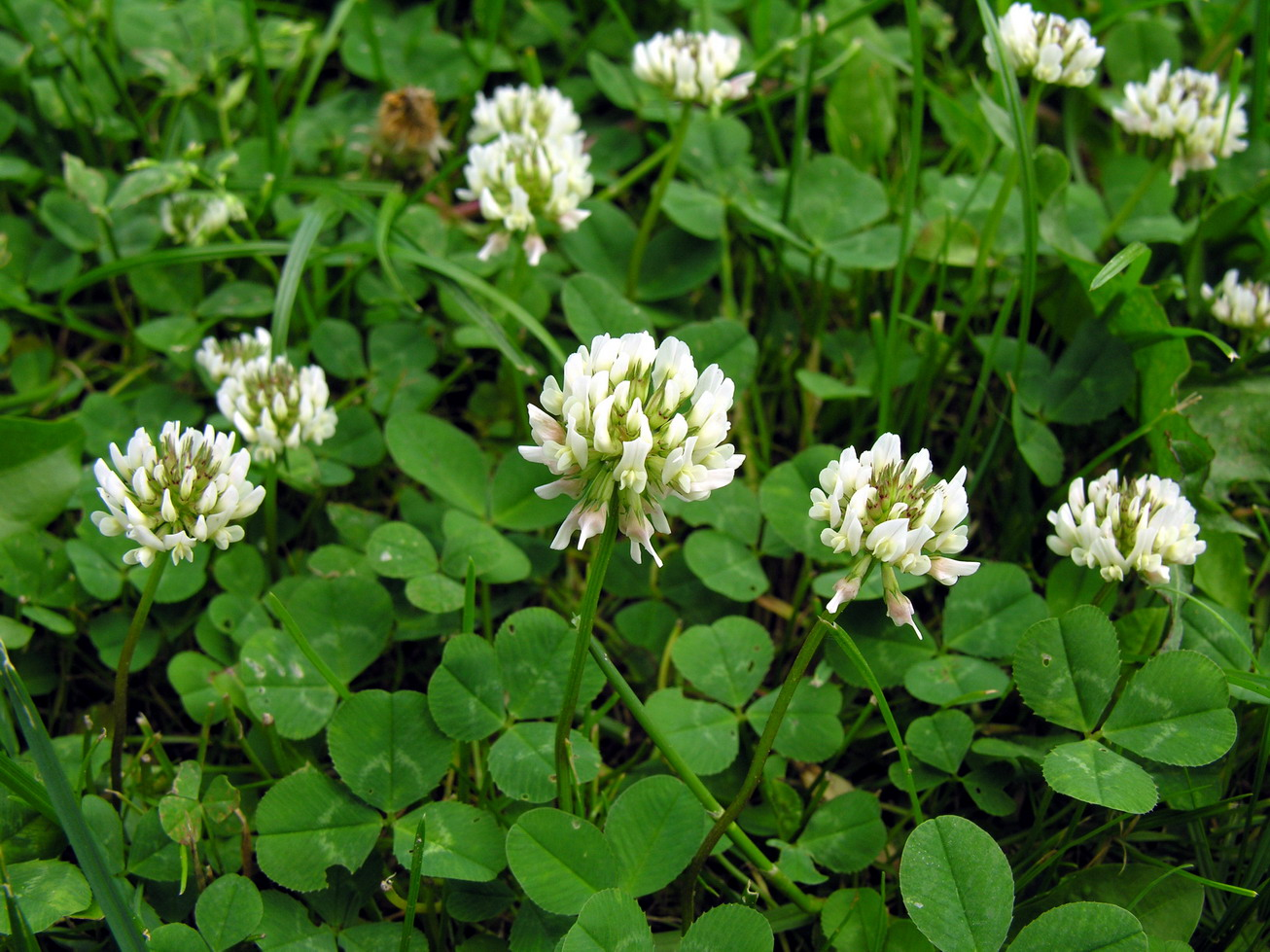
- Trifolium repens

Scientific classification
- Kingdom: Plantae
- Clade: Tracheophytes
- Clade: Angiosperms
- Clade: Eudicots
- Clade: Rosids
- Order: Fabales
- Family: Fabaceae
- Subfamily: Faboideae
- Clade: Meso-Papilionoideae
- Clade: Non-protein amino acid-accumulating clade
- Clade: Hologalegina
- Clade: Inverted repeat-lacking clade
- Tribe: Trifolieae (Bronn) Endl.

= Trifolieae =

Tribe of legumes

The tribe Trifolieae is one of the subdivisions of the plant family Fabaceae. It is included within the inverted repeat-lacking clade (IRLC). All of the members of this tribe are trifoliate.

These genera are recognized by the USDA:

- Medicago L. – alfalfas, medicks
- Melilotus Mill. – sweetclovers
- Ononis L. – restharrows
- Parochetus Buch.-Ham. ex D. Don – shamrock pea, blue oxalis
- Trifolium L. – clovers
- Trigonella L. – fenugreeks
