= Biserrula =

Scientific classification
- Kingdom: Plantae
- Clade: Tracheophytes
- Clade: Angiosperms
- Clade: Eudicots
- Clade: Rosids
- Order: Fabales
- Family: Fabaceae
- Subfamily: Faboideae
- Clade: Hologalegina
- Clade: Inverted repeat-lacking clade
- Tribe: Galegeae
- Genus: Biserrula; L.

Species
- See text

Synonyms
- Pelecinus Mill.

Genus of Fabaceae plants

Biserrula is a genus of flowering plants in the family Fabaceae, found in Portugal (including Madeira and Selvagens), the Canary Islands, all the Mediterranean countries, the Arabian peninsula, and in east Africa as far south as Tanzania. Biserrula pelecinus, generally called just "biserrula", is under domestication in Australia as a forage legume.

== Species ==
Currently accepted species include:

- Biserrula epiglottis (L.) Coulot, Rabaute & J.-M.Tison
- Biserrula pelecinus L.
