= Sphaerophysa =

Sphaerophysa may refer to:

- Sphaerophysa (fish), a genus of fishes in the family Nemacheilidae
- Sphaerophysa (plant), a genus of plants in the family Fabaceae
