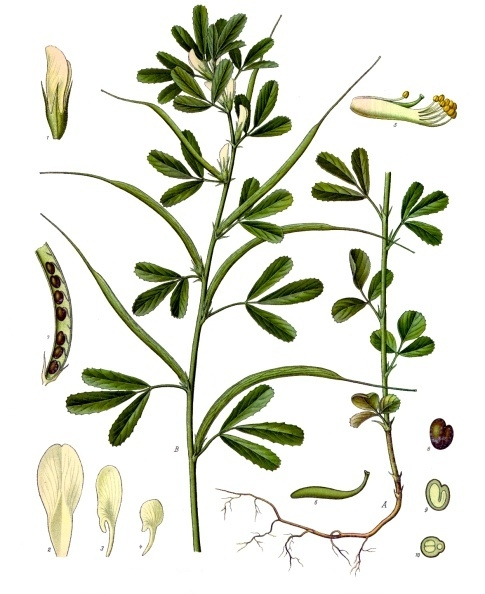
- Trigonella foenum-graecum

Scientific classification
- Kingdom: Plantae
- Clade: Embryophytes
- Clade: Tracheophytes
- Clade: Spermatophytes
- Clade: Angiosperms
- Clade: Eudicots
- Clade: Rosids
- Order: Fabales
- Family: Fabaceae
- Subfamily: Faboideae
- Clade: Inverted repeat-lacking clade
- Tribe: Trifolieae
- Genus: Trigonella; L.

Species
- See text.

Synonyms
- Aporanthus Bromf.; Botryolotus Jaub. & Spach; Buceras Hallier ex All.; Fenugraecum Adans.; Foenugraecum Ludw.; Foenum-graecum Ség.; Folliculigera Pasq.; Grammocarpus Schur; Kentia Adans.; Melilotoides Heist. ex Fabr.; Melisitus Medik.; Melissitus Medik.; Pocockia Ser.; Radiata Medik.; Teliosma Alef.; Telis L. ex Kuntze; Trifoliastrum Moench; Triphyllum Medik.; Xiphostylis Gasp.

= Trigonella =

Genus of flowering plants

Trigonella is a genus from the family Fabaceae. The best known member is the herb fenugreek. Members of the genus occur naturally in the Canary Islands, southern Europe, non‑tropical Africa, western and central Asia, the Indian subcontinent, and Australia.

== Species ==
Currently accepted species include:

- Trigonella adscendens (Nevski) Afan. & Gontsch.
- Trigonella afghanica Vassilcz.
- Trigonella anguina Delile
- Trigonella aphanoneura Rech.f.
- Trigonella arabica Delile
- Trigonella aristata Vassilcz.
- Trigonella bactriana Vassilcz.
- Trigonella badachschanica Afan.
- Trigonella bakhtiarica Ranjbar & Z.Hajmoradi
- Trigonella balachowskyi Leredde
- Trigonella balansae Boiss. & Reut.
- Trigonella berythea Boiss. & Blanche
- Trigonella binaloudensis Ranjbar & Karamian
- Trigonella cachemiriana Cambess.
- Trigonella caelesyriaca Boiss.
- Trigonella caerulea (L.) Ser.
- Trigonella calliceras Fisch. ex M.Bieb.
- Trigonella capitata Boiss.
- Trigonella cariensis Boiss.
- Trigonella cassia Boiss.
- Trigonella cedretorum Vassilcz.
- Trigonella cephalotes Boiss. & Balansa
- Trigonella cilicica Hub.-Mor.
- Trigonella coerulescens (M.Bieb.) Halácsy
- Trigonella corniculata (L.) L.
- Trigonella cretica (L.) Boiss.
- Trigonella cylindracea Desv.
- Trigonella dasycarpa (Ser.) Vassilcz.
- Trigonella disperma Bornm.
- Trigonella edelbergii (Širj. & Rech.f.) Rech.f.
- Trigonella elliptica Boiss.
- Trigonella emodi Benth.
- Trigonella falcata Balf.f.
- Trigonella filipes Boiss.
- Trigonella fimbriata Royle ex Benth.
- Trigonella foenum-graecum L.
- Trigonella freitagii Vassilcz.
- Trigonella gharuensis Rech.f.
- Trigonella glabra Thunb.
- Trigonella gladiata Steven ex M.Bieb.
- Trigonella gontscharovii Vassilcz.
- Trigonella gracilis Benth.
- Trigonella graeca (Boiss. & Spruner) Boiss.
- Trigonella grandiflora Bunge
- Trigonella griffithii Boiss.
- Trigonella heratensis Rech.f.
- Trigonella hierosolymitana Boiss.
- Trigonella ionantha Rech.f.
- Trigonella iskanderi Vassilcz.
- Trigonella kafirniganica Vassilcz.
- Trigonella khalkhalica Ranjbar & Z.Hajmoradi
- Trigonella koeiei Širj. & Rech.f.
- Trigonella korovinii Vassilcz.
- Trigonella kotschyi Fenzl ex Boiss.
- Trigonella laciniata L.
- Trigonella lasiocarpa Ranjbar & Z.Hajmoradi
- Trigonella late-alata (Bornm.) Vassilcz.
- Trigonella laxiflora Aitch. & Baker
- Trigonella laxissima Vassilcz.
- Trigonella lilacina Boiss.
- Trigonella linczevskii Vassilcz.
- Trigonella lipskyi Širj.
- Trigonella lycica Hub.-Mor.
- Trigonella macrorrhyncha Boiss.
- Trigonella marco-poloi Vassilcz.
- Trigonella maritima Delile ex Poir.
- Trigonella media Delile ex Urb.
- Trigonella mesopotamica Hub.-Mor.
- Trigonella obcordata Benth.
- Trigonella occulta Delile ex Ser.
- Trigonella pamirica Boriss.
- Trigonella platyphylla Sam. ex Rech.f.
- Trigonella podlechii Vassilcz.
- Trigonella podperae (Širj.) Vassilcz.
- Trigonella procumbens (Besser) Rchb.
- Trigonella pseudocapitata Contandr. & Quézel
- Trigonella pycnotricha Rech.f.
- Trigonella raphanina Boiss.
- Trigonella rechingeri Širj.
- Trigonella rotundifolia (Sm.) Strid
- Trigonella salangensis Vassilcz.
- Trigonella schlumbergeri Boiss.
- Trigonella × schweinfurthiana Muschl.
- Trigonella × sickenbergeriana Muschl.
- Trigonella siunica Vassilcz.
- Trigonella smyrnea Boiss.
- Trigonella spicata Sm.
- Trigonella spinosa L.
- Trigonella spruneriana Boiss.
- Trigonella squarrosa Vassilcz.
- Trigonella stellata Forssk.
- Trigonella stenocarpa Rech.f.
- Trigonella stipitata Ranjbar & Joharchi
- Trigonella strangulata Boiss.
- Trigonella striata L.f.
- Trigonella suavissima Lindl.
- Trigonella subenervis Rech.f.
- Trigonella teheranica Bornm.
- Trigonella torbatejamensis Ranjbar
- Trigonella turkmena Popov
- Trigonella uncinata Banks & Sol.
- Trigonella velutina Boiss.
- Trigonella velutinoides Hub.-Mor.
- Trigonella verae Širj.
- Trigonella xeromorpha Rech.f.
- Trigonella yasujensis Ranjbar, Z.Hajmoradi & Karamian
- Trigonella zaprjagaevii Afan. & Gontsch.
