= Podlechiella =

Scientific classification
- Kingdom: Plantae
- Clade: Tracheophytes
- Clade: Angiosperms
- Clade: Eudicots
- Clade: Rosids
- Order: Fabales
- Family: Fabaceae
- Subfamily: Faboideae
- Clade: Hologalegina
- Clade: Inverted repeat-lacking clade
- Tribe: Hedysareae
- Genus: Podlechiella; Maassoumi & Kaz.Osaloo
- Species: P. vogelii

Binomial name
- Podlechiella vogelii (Webb) Maassoumi & Kaz.Osaloo

Subspecies
- Podlechiella vogelii subsp. fatmensis (Chiov.) Maassoumi & Kaz.Osaloo; Podlechiella vogelii subsp. vogelii

Synonyms
- Astragalus vogelii (Webb) Bornm.; Phaca vogelii Webb (1848) (basionym)

Genus of flowering plants

Podlechiella is a genus of flowering plants in the pea family, Fabaceae. It includes a single species, Podlechiella vogelii, an annual native to the deserts of North Africa and Western Asia, from the Cape Verde Islands across the Sahara and Arabian deserts to northwestern India.

Two subspecies are accepted.

- Podlechiella vogelii subsp. fatmensis (Chiov.) Maassoumi & Kaz.Osaloo – Algeria to northwestern India
- Podlechiella vogelii subsp. vogelii – Cape Verde Islands to western and central Sahara, and Sinai to the Arabian Peninsula
