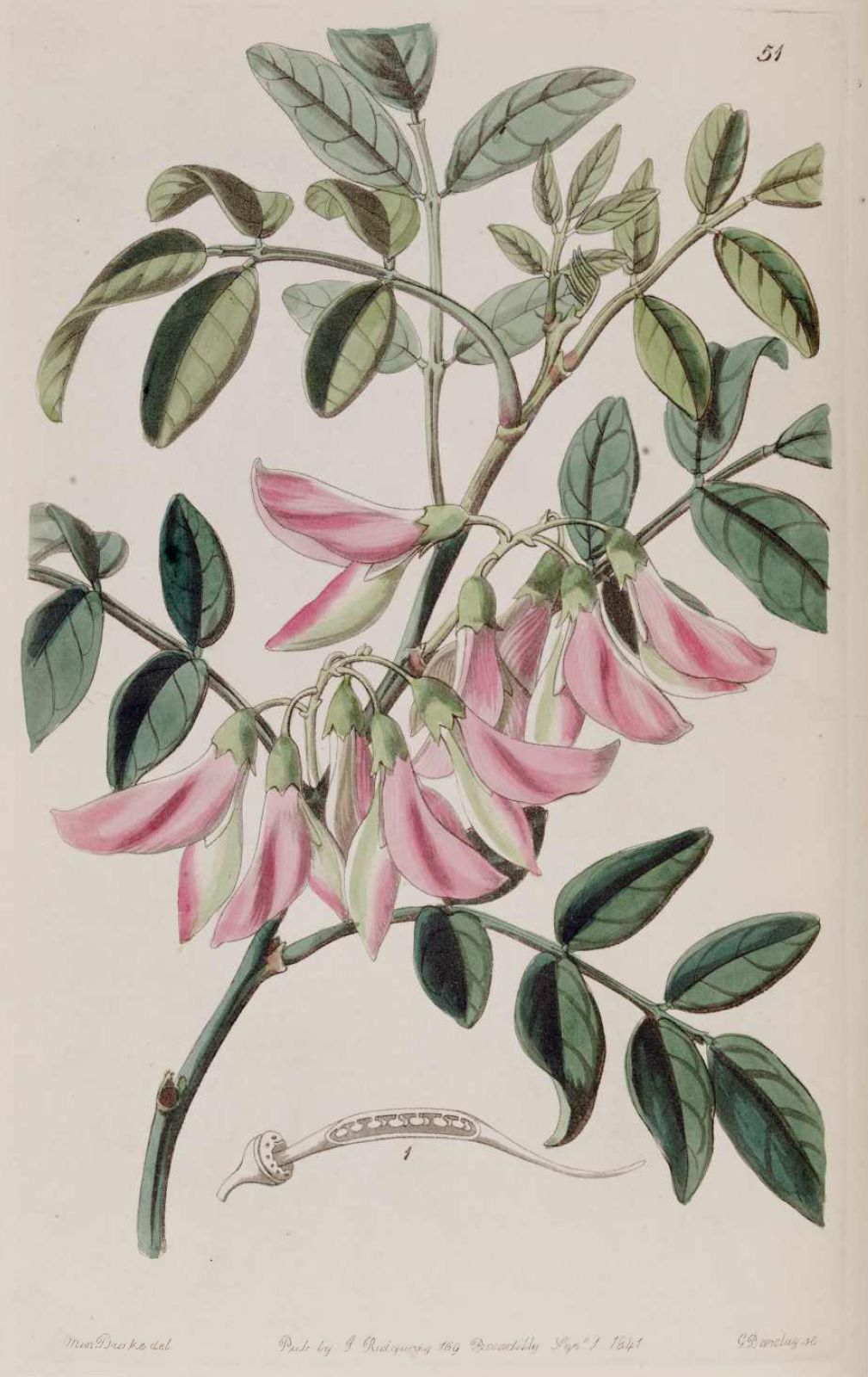
- Plate by Sarah Drake

Conservation status
- Extinct (IUCN 3.1)

Scientific classification
- Kingdom: Plantae
- Clade: Embryophytes
- Clade: Tracheophytes
- Clade: Spermatophytes
- Clade: Angiosperms
- Clade: Eudicots
- Clade: Rosids
- Order: Fabales
- Family: Fabaceae
- Subfamily: Faboideae
- Tribe: Galegeae
- Genus: †Streblorrhiza; Endl.
- Species: †S. speciosa

Binomial name
- †Streblorrhiza speciosa Endl.

Synonyms
- Clianthus baueri A.Cunn. ex Maiden, not validly publ.; Clianthus carneus Lindl.; Clianthus pictus Endl.; Clianthus speciosus (Endl.) Steud.

= Streblorrhiza =

Extinct species of legume

Streblorrhiza was a monotypic genus of legumes in the family Fabaceae. Its only species was Streblorrhiza speciosa, a perennial shrub endemic to Phillip Island. It is now presumed extinct.

The plant was first described by Stephan Endlicher in 1833, using two specimens collected by Ferdinand Bauer as the type for a new monotypic genus. One of these is the only known fruiting specimen.

The species became extinct in 1860 in its native habit, but the plant was known to have been cultivated. An appeal was made in 2007 to discover the plant in historic gardens. The species was declared extinct worldwide by the IUCN in 1978, before revising it to endangered, and again extinct in 1998. A DNA study found it to be most closely related to Carmichaelia, Clianthus, Montigena and Swainsona.
