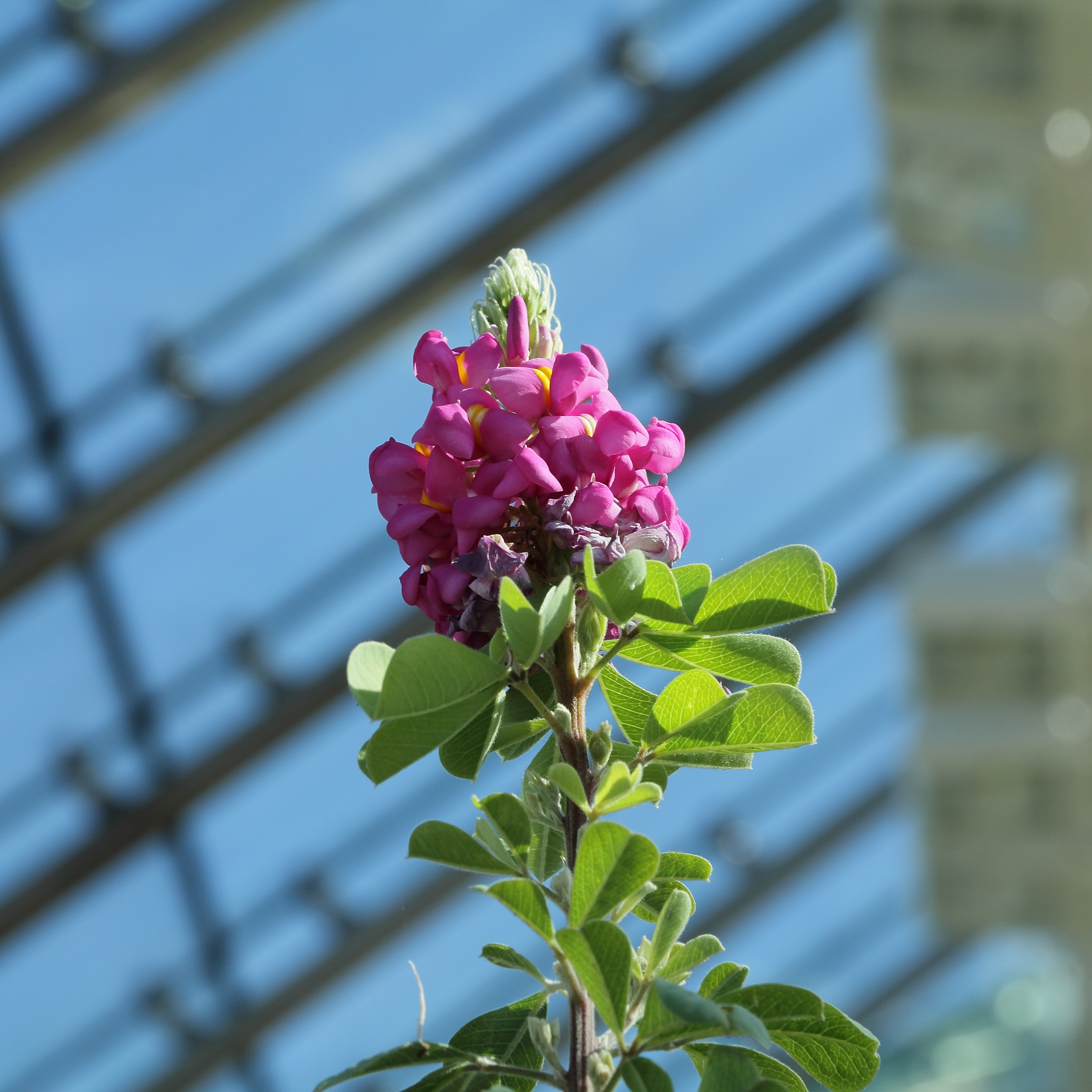
- Hypocalyptus sophoroides

Scientific classification
- Kingdom: Plantae
- Clade: Tracheophytes
- Clade: Angiosperms
- Clade: Eudicots
- Clade: Rosids
- Order: Fabales
- Family: Fabaceae
- Subfamily: Faboideae
- Clade: Meso-Papilionoideae
- Clade: Non-protein amino acid-accumulating clade
- Tribe: Hypocalypteae (Yakovlev) A. L. Schutte and Van Wyk B-E.
- Genus: Hypocalyptus; Thunb. (1800)

Species
- See text.

Synonyms
- Crotalaria sect. Purpureae Benth.; Duvalia Bonpl. (1813), nom. illeg.; Loddigesia Sims (1808)

= Hypocalyptus =

Genus of legumes

Hypocalyptus is a genus of flowering plants in the family Fabaceae. It includes three species of shrubs, subshrubs or small trees native to the Cape region of South Africa. Typical habitats include Mediterranean-climate shrubland (fynbos) at forest margins, in rocky and sandy areas, and along streams, often at high elevations.

The genus belongs to the subfamily Faboideae and is the only genus found in tribe Hypocalypteae.

== Species ==
Hypocalyptus comprises the following species:

- Hypocalyptus coluteoides (Lam.) R. Dahlgren
- Hypocalyptus oxalidifolius (Sims) Baill.
- Hypocalyptus sophoroides (P.J.Bergius) Baill.

== Formerly placed here ==
- Hypocalyptus calyptratus (Retz.) Thunb. is a synonym of Podalyria calyptrata
- Hypocalyptus capensis Thunb. is a synonym of Virgilia oroboides subsp. oroboides
- Hypocalyptus pedunculatus (Thunb.) Thunb. is a synonym of Podalyria biflora
- Hypocalyptus sericeus Thunb. is a synonym of Podalyria leipoldtii
