= Trigonella falcata =

Conservation status
- Data Deficient (IUCN 3.1)

Scientific classification
- Kingdom: Plantae
- Clade: Tracheophytes
- Clade: Angiosperms
- Clade: Eudicots
- Clade: Rosids
- Order: Fabales
- Family: Fabaceae
- Subfamily: Faboideae
- Genus: Trigonella
- Species: T. falcata

Binomial name
- Trigonella falcata Balf.f.

Synonyms
- Telis falcata (Balf.f.) Kuntze

Species of plant

Trigonella falcata is a species of plant in the family Fabaceae. It is endemic to western Socotra in Yemen. Its natural habitats are subtropical or tropical dry forests and rocky areas.
