= Trigonella berythea =

Scientific classification
- Kingdom: Plantae
- Clade: Tracheophytes
- Clade: Angiosperms
- Clade: Eudicots
- Clade: Rosids
- Order: Fabales
- Family: Fabaceae
- Subfamily: Faboideae
- Genus: Trigonella
- Species: T. berythea

Binomial name
- Trigonella berythea Boiss. & C.I.Blanche

Synonyms
- Trigonella foenum-graecum var. berythea (Boiss. & C.I.Blanche) Post

Species of plant

Trigonella berythea (Beirut fenugreek, Arabic: حلبة بيروت) is a plant species in the legume family. Its natural habitat is the subtropical biome and endemic to the Eastern Mediterranean.

== Description ==
First published in Pierre Edmond Boissier's Diagnoses plantarum Orientalium novarum in 1856. The plant is annual with white hairs sparsely scattered on the branches and petioles, especially hairy on the upper side. The stems are erect or ascending, sparsely branched. The stipules are ovate, with a very short, acuminated tip, attached to the petiole at the lower part of the stipule. The petiole is equal in length to or longer than the leaflets, which are obovate, with a cuneate base, and have the upper side slightly obtuse and only obscurely dentate. The calyx is tubular, cylindrical, with lanceolate-subulate teeth that are almost subequal. The corolla is almost double the length of the sepal, the legumes are straight, linear, subcompressed, parallel, and slightly wrinkled, with a beak about half its length, abruptly shortened at the end. This species is closely related to Trigonella foenum-graecum but differs from it in the narrower and longer stipules, the oblong-spathulate leaflets with ciliate teeth, the legumes which are less compressed and have a more strongly marked reticulated surface, traversed by fine nerves that are somewhat distant from each other.

== Etymology ==
Berythea refers to Beirut, specifically to Ras Beirut, where the plant was first described.

== Distribution and habitat ==
The plant grows in the subtropical biome, and is endemic to Cyprus, Lebanon, Syria, Palestine, and the Sinai Peninsula. The species was discovered by Emmanuel-Louis Blanche, observed in April 1843 and 1850 near the promontory of Ras Beirut, and in the hills and foothills of the Lebanon mountains above Sidon.

== See also ==
- Flora of Lebanon
