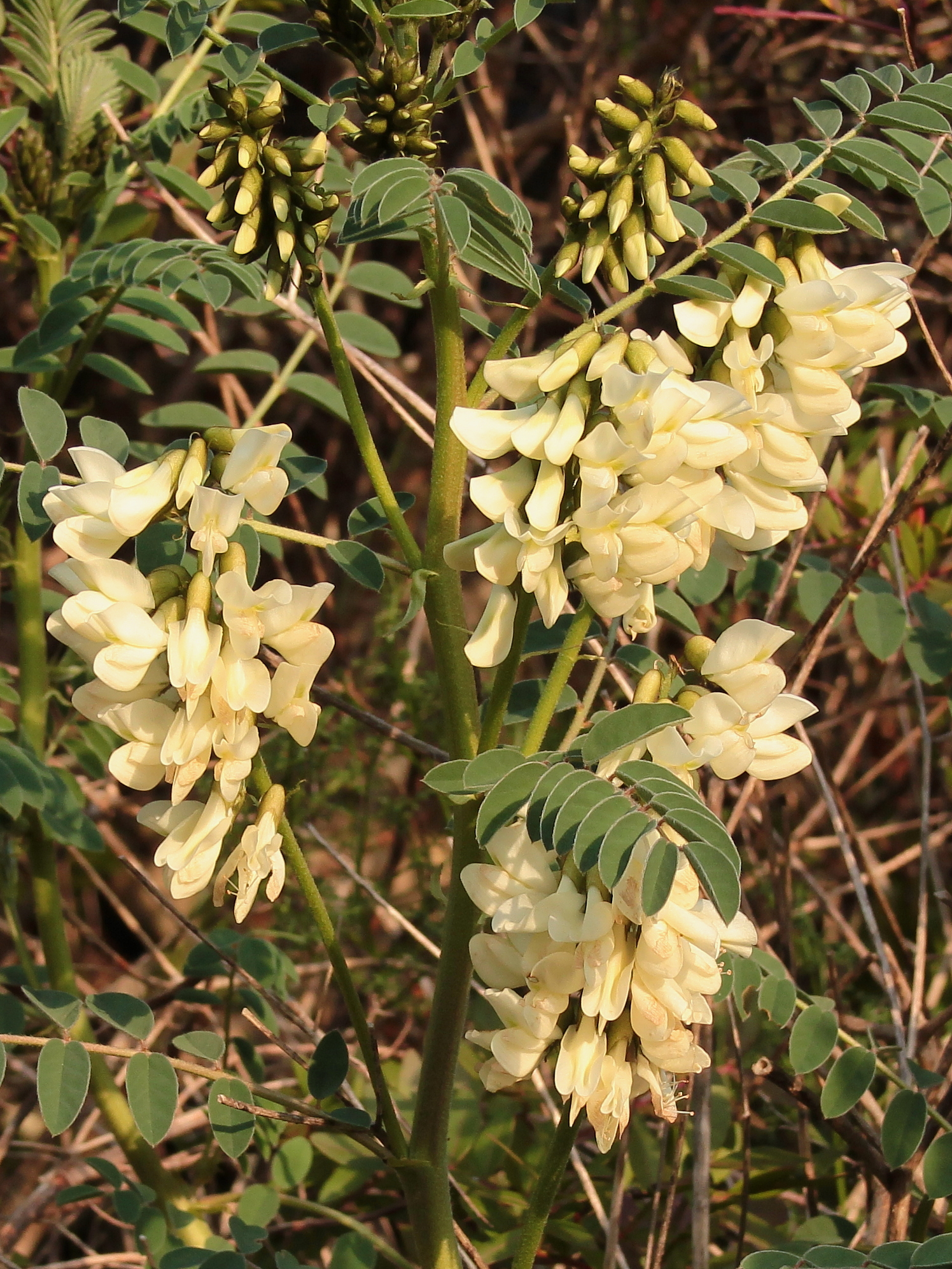
- Inflorescence

Scientific classification
- Kingdom: Plantae
- Clade: Tracheophytes
- Clade: Angiosperms
- Clade: Eudicots
- Clade: Rosids
- Order: Fabales
- Family: Fabaceae
- Subfamily: Faboideae
- Tribe: Galegeae
- Subtribe: Erophacinae
- Genus: Erophaca; Boiss.
- Species: E. baetica

Binomial name
- Erophaca baetica (L.), Boiss.

Synonyms
- Astragalus lusitanicus Lam.; Astragalus dorycnioides Scop.; Colutea baetica (L.) Poir.; Phaca baetica L.

= Erophaca =

Genus of legumes

Erophaca is a monotypic genus of the tribe Galegeae. Its only species, Erophaca baetica, is a perennial plant distributed in disjunct populations in the Mediterranean Region.

According to nrDNA ITS analysis, Erophaca is monophyletic and related to the Astragalean clade. It is also andromonoecious (a rare sexual system among the angiosperms and a novelty for Old World papilionoid legumes).

Erophaca baetica has two subspecies distributed at opposite ends of the Mediterranean region:

- E. baetica subsp. baetica: Native to the southern half of the Iberian Peninsula (Portugal and Spain) and Northwest Africa (Morocco and Algeria).
- E. baetica subsp. orientalis: Native to the Eastern Mediterranean (Greece, Turkey, Cyprus and Lebanon).

Some populations in Algeria were found to be hybrids of the two subspecies.

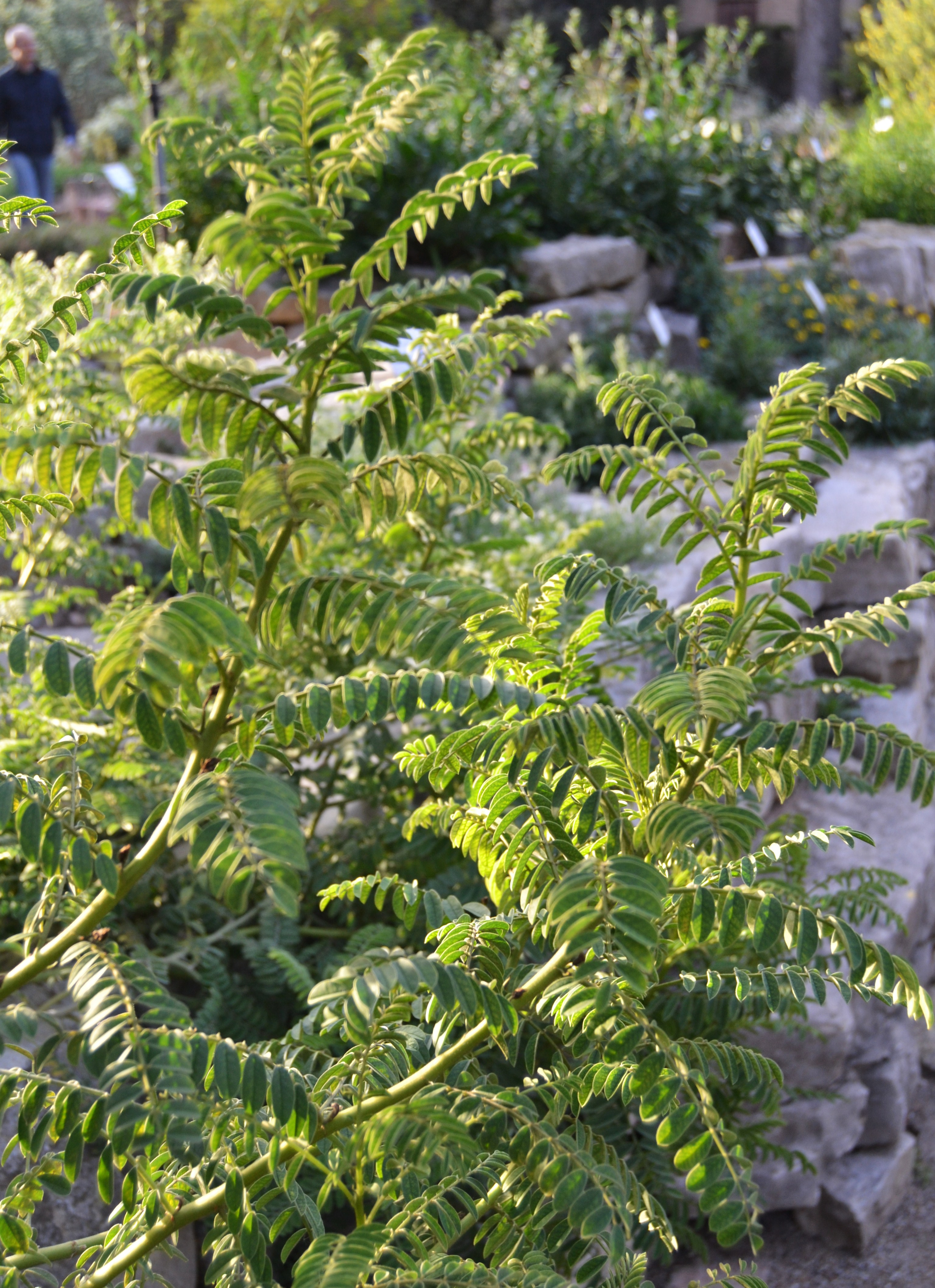
Leaves

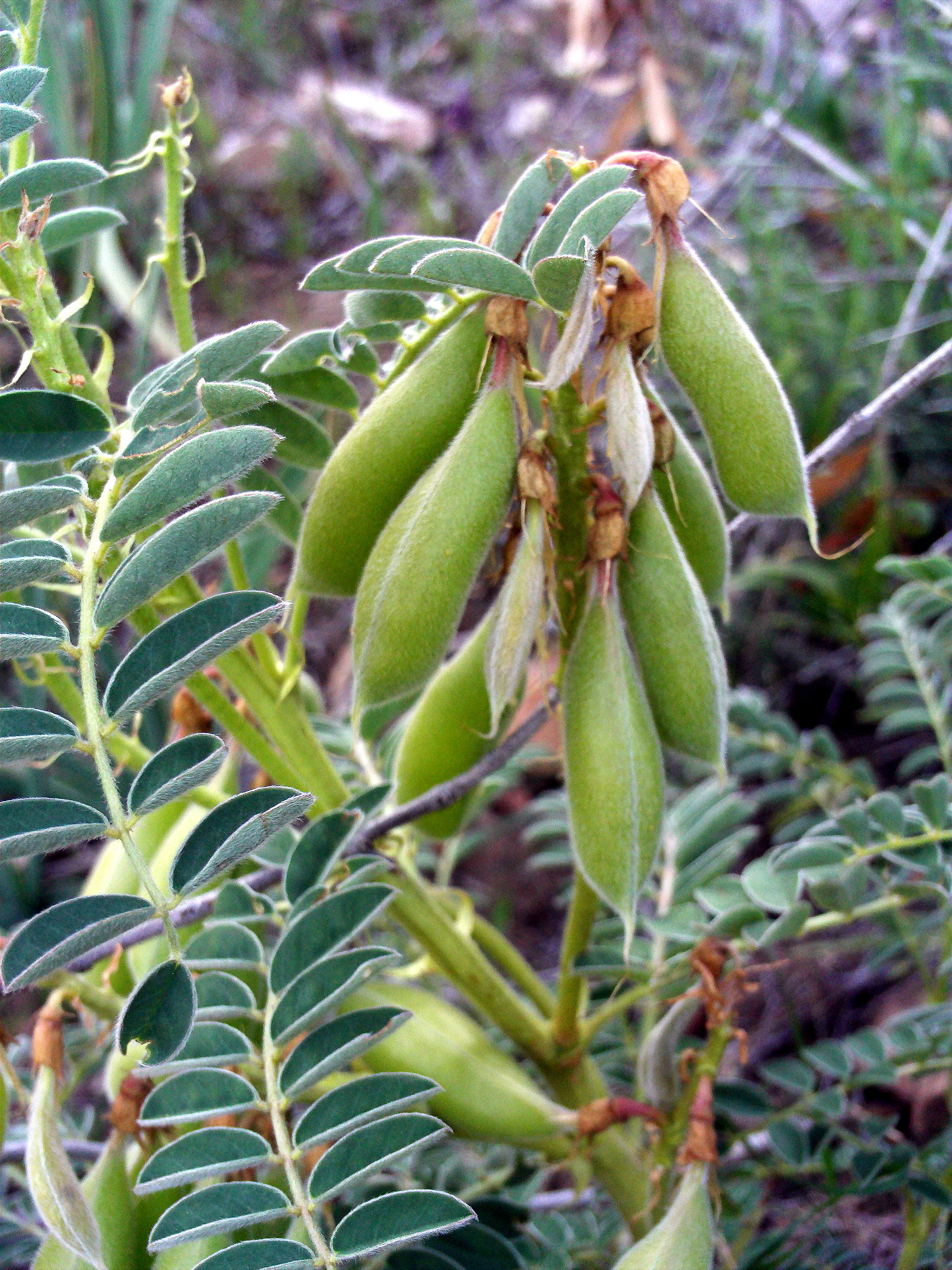
Fruits
