= Trigonella maritima =

Scientific classification
- Kingdom: Plantae
- Clade: Tracheophytes
- Clade: Angiosperms
- Clade: Eudicots
- Clade: Rosids
- Order: Fabales
- Family: Fabaceae
- Subfamily: Faboideae
- Genus: Trigonella
- Species: T. maritima

Binomial name
- Trigonella maritima Poir.

Synonyms
- Trigonella dura

Species of plant

Trigonella maritima is a species of plant in the family Fabaceae.

== Sources ==
This article incorporates text from a free content work. Licensed under CC0 (license statement/permission). Text taken from Trigonella maritima. Encyclopedia of Life.
