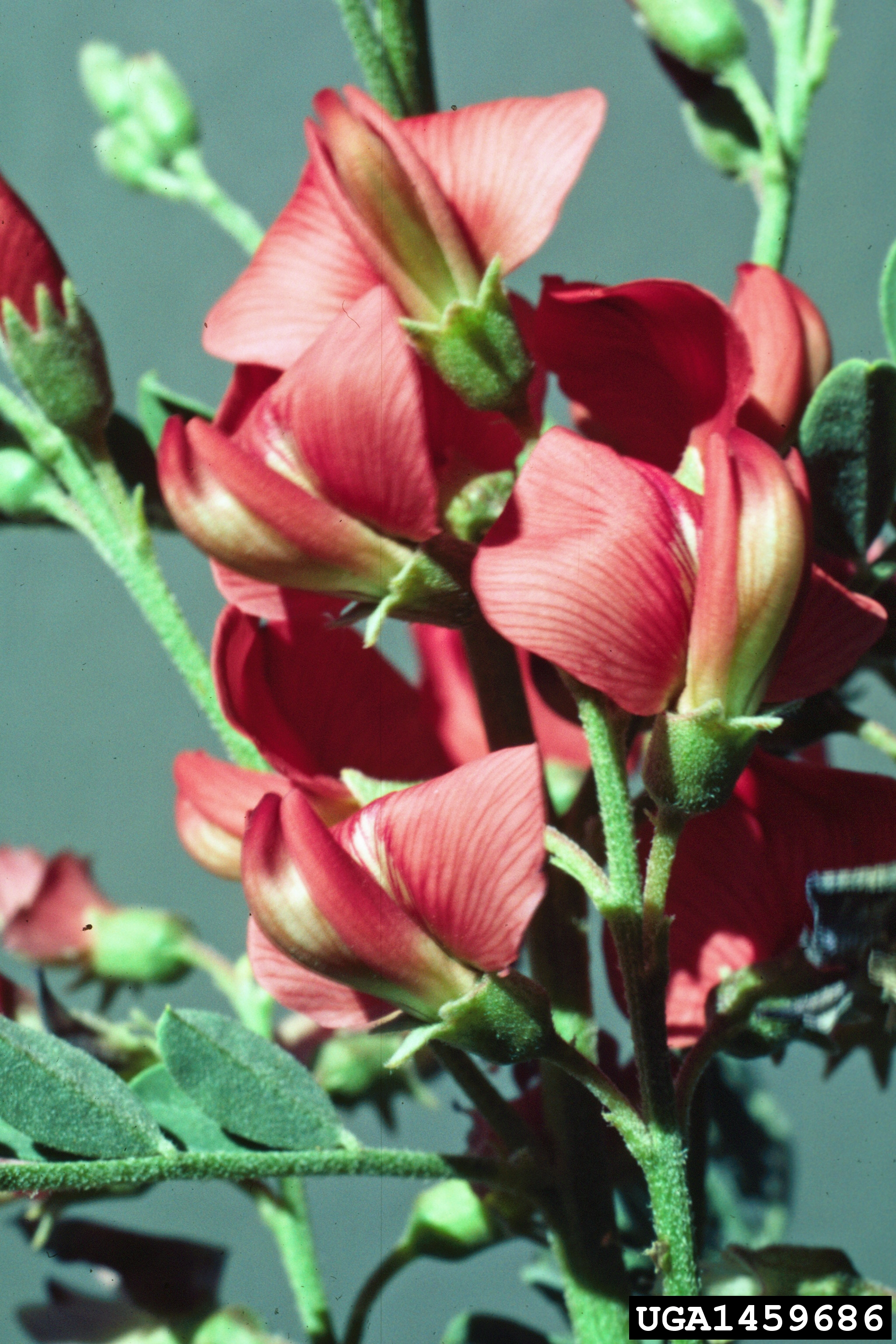
- Sphaerophysa salsula

Scientific classification
- Kingdom: Plantae
- Clade: Tracheophytes
- Clade: Angiosperms
- Clade: Eudicots
- Clade: Rosids
- Order: Fabales
- Family: Fabaceae
- Subfamily: Faboideae
- Tribe: Galegeae
- Subtribe: Astragalinae
- Genus: Sphaerophysa; DC.

Species
- 2, see text

= Sphaerophysa (plant) =

Genus of legumes

Sphaerophysa is a genus of flowering plants in the family Fabaceae. It belongs to the subfamily Faboideae.

The species distributed from West Asia, Central Asia, Siberia and East Asia. There are two species:

- Sphaerophysa kotschyana is a sensitive plant endemic to Central Anatolia.
- Sphaerophysa salsula, on the other hand, is an Asian plant that is well known on other continents as an introduced species and sometimes a weed.
