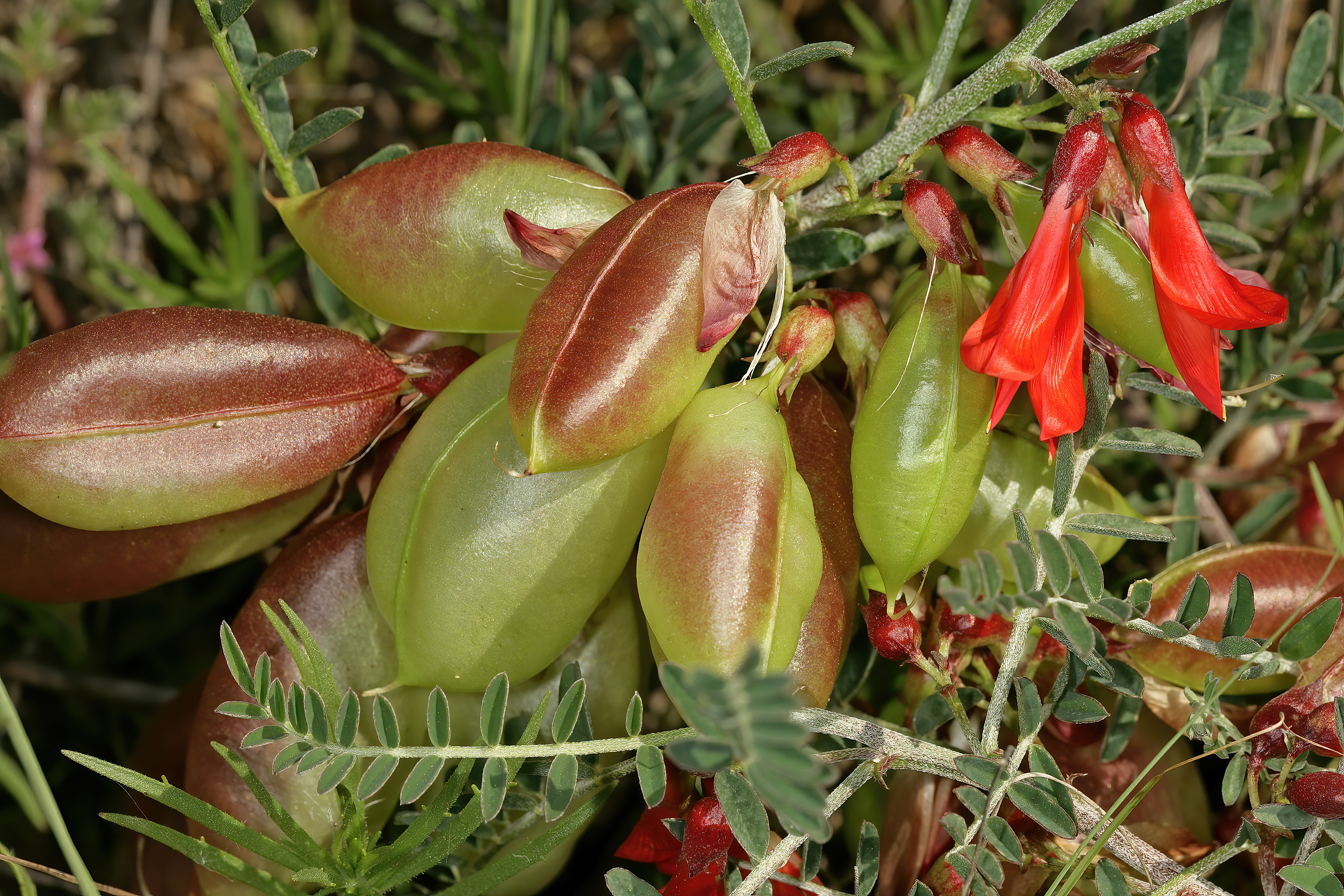
- Foliage, flowers and immature seed pods, at Rooikoppe, Little Karroo, Western Cape, South Africa

Scientific classification
- Kingdom: Plantae
- Clade: Tracheophytes
- Clade: Angiosperms
- Clade: Eudicots
- Clade: Rosids
- Order: Fabales
- Family: Fabaceae
- Subfamily: Faboideae
- Genus: Lessertia
- Species: L. frutescens

Binomial name
- Lessertia frutescens (L.) Goldblatt & J.C.Manning

= Lessertia frutescens =

Species of legume

Lessertia frutescens (syn. Sutherlandia frutescens (L.) R.Br.; Colutea frutescens L.) is a southern African legume in the family Fabaceae. It is also known as cancer bush, balloon pea, Cape bladder pea, sutherlandia; and phetola ("it changes") in seTswana, and insiswa ("the one that drives away the darkness") in isiZulu. It is a shrub with bitter, aromatic leaves, with red-orange flowers appearing in spring to mid-summer. These are followed by inflated, air-filled pods containing the seeds.

== Description ==
Lessertia frutescens is a small bush growing up to about 1 m (39 in) high. It is native to dry parts of southern Africa, preferring full sun but tolerant of a wide variety of soil types. It is a tough, hardy, fast growing and drought tolerant but short lived plant. Seeds germinate readily in around two to three weeks and established plants self-seed readily.

== Cultivation ==
Seedlings may be vulnerable to damping off, but provided it is in well-drained soil, it grows readily and is not very vulnerable to pests.
