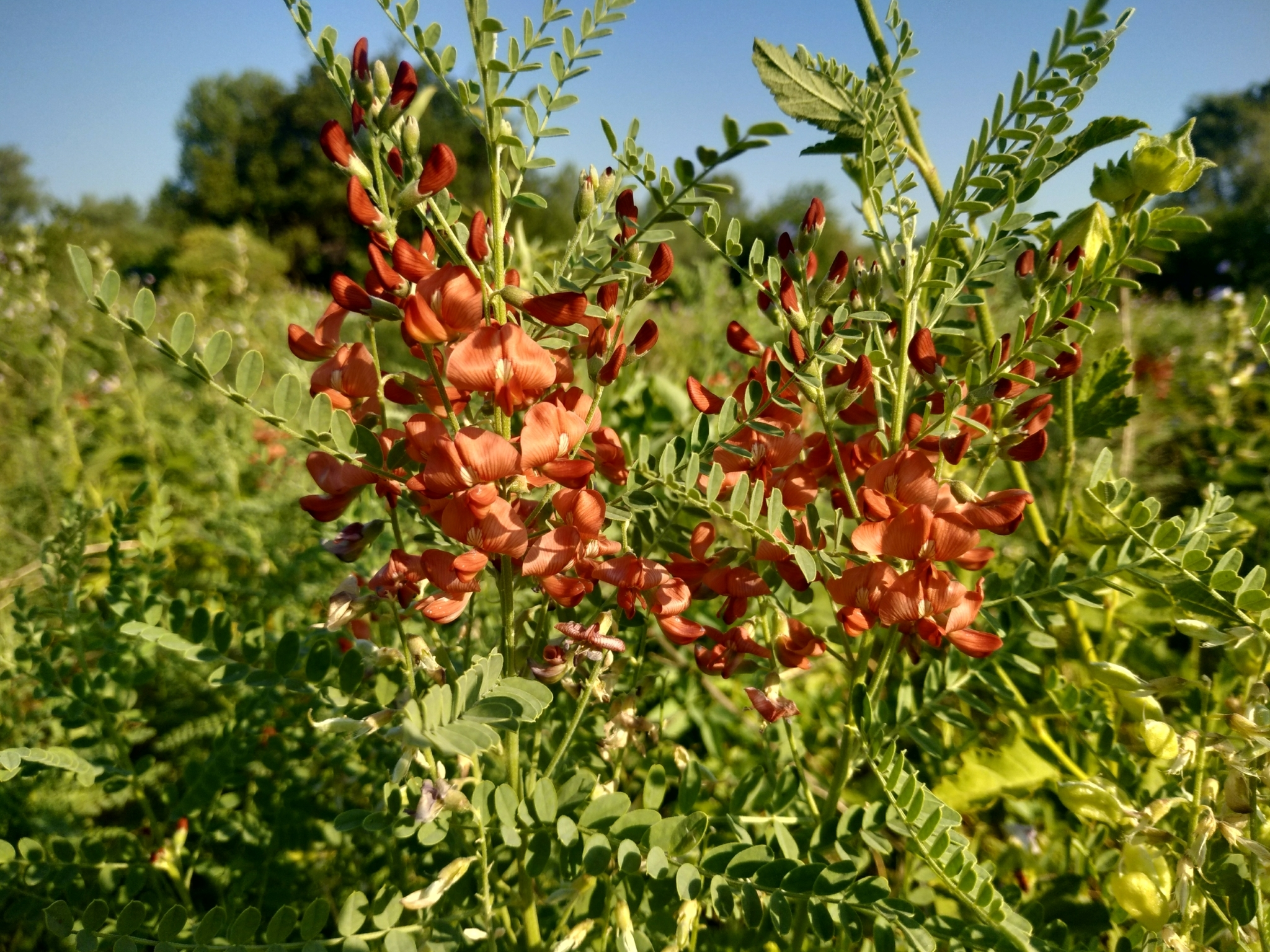
- Sphaerophysa salsula in Semey Ormany Nature Reserve, Ozërka, Kazakhstan

Scientific classification
- Kingdom: Plantae
- Clade: Tracheophytes
- Clade: Angiosperms
- Clade: Eudicots
- Clade: Rosids
- Order: Fabales
- Family: Fabaceae
- Subfamily: Faboideae
- Genus: Sphaerophysa
- Species: S. salsula

Binomial name
- Sphaerophysa salsula (Pall.) DC.

Synonyms
- List: Astragalus iochrous Barneby (1944); Astragalus violaceus R.P.St.John (1929); Colutea caspica M.Bieb. (1808); Colutea davurica Spreng. (1826); Colutea salsula (Pall.) Poir. (1811); Phaca salsula Pall. (1776); Sphaerophysa caspica DC. (1825); Swainsona salsula (Pall.) Taub. (1894)

= Sphaerophysa salsula =

Plant species in the pea family

Sphaerophysa salsula is a species of flowering plant in the legume family known by the common names alkali swainsonpea, Austrian peaweed, and red bladder-vetch. It is native to Asia but it is known in many other parts of the world as an introduced species and often a noxious weed. It grows in cultivated land and disturbed habitat, easily tolerating alkaline substrates. It is commonly seen in areas where alfalfa is grown, because the seeds of the two species look similar and the weed seed is easily imported with the crop seed.

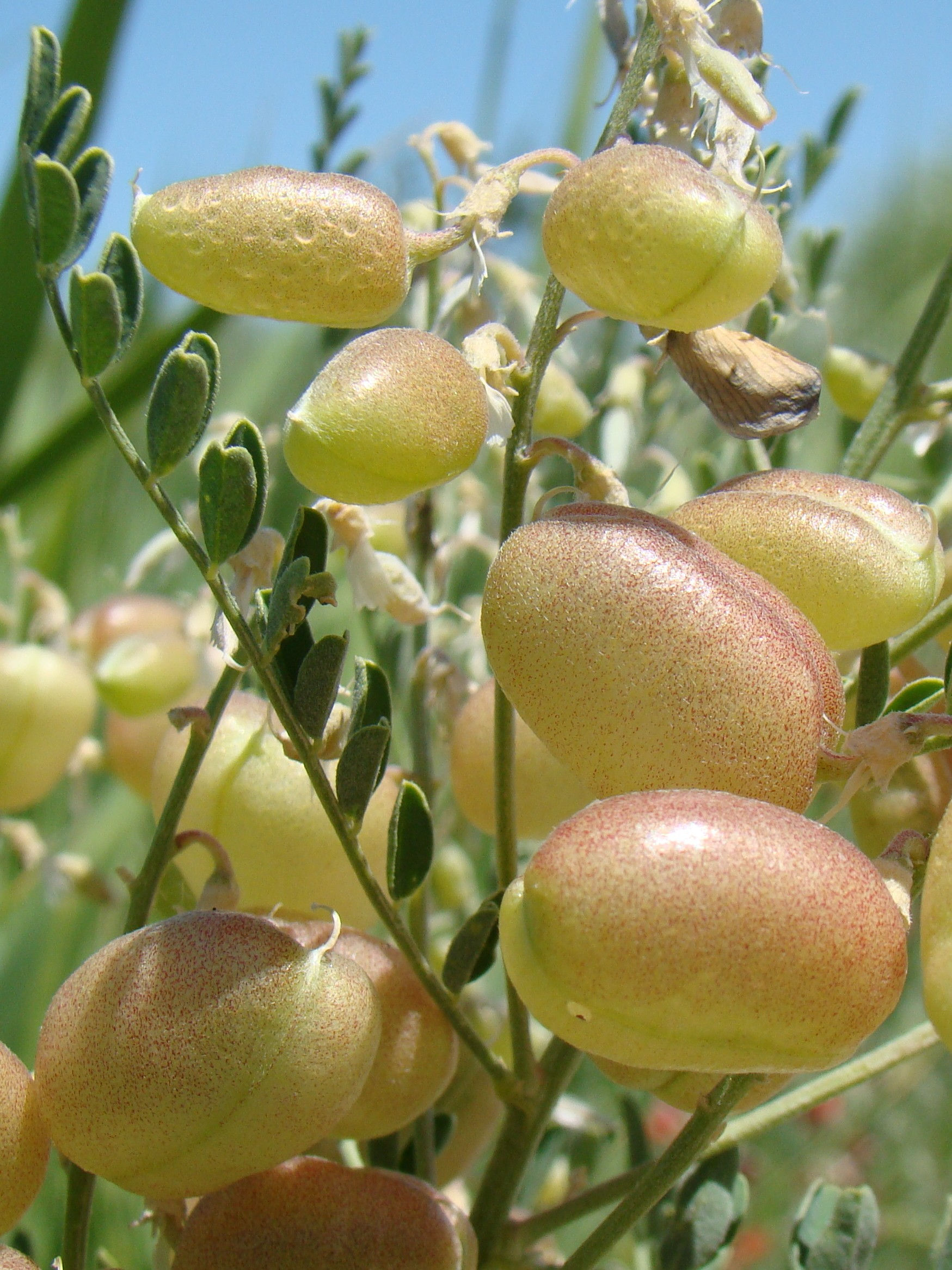
Seed pods, at Baikonur, Kazakhstan

This is a long-lived perennial herb growing up to 1.5 m tall. It reproduces via seed as well as by sprouting vigorously from its creeping root system. The stems are coated in short white hairs. The leaves are made up of many oval leaflets each up to 2 cm long. The inflorescence is a raceme of several pea-like flowers each just over 1 cm wide. They may be brick-red to deep pink to brownish to red-orange. The fruit is a legume pod up to 3.5 cm long. It is inflated and bladderlike, hairless, translucent, shiny, and papery when dry. It is mottled greenish or reddish. It contains several seeds each about two millimeters long.

Like other legumes, this plant contains endophytes. These include the bacterium Paracoccus sphaerophysae, which was recently isolated from the roots of this species, and named after it. Other rhizobia in this species include Shinella kummerowiae and species of the genera Rhizobium, Agrobacterium, and Mesorhizobium.
