= Phyllolobium =

Scientific classification
- Kingdom: Plantae
- Clade: Tracheophytes
- Clade: Angiosperms
- Clade: Eudicots
- Clade: Rosids
- Order: Fabales
- Family: Fabaceae
- Genus: Phyllolobium; Fisch.

Genus of plants

Phyllolobium is a genus of flowering plants belonging to the family Fabaceae.

Its native range is Central Asia to Himalaya and China.

Species:

- Phyllolobium balfourianum (N.D.Simpson) M.L.Zhang & Podlech
- Phyllolobium camptodontum (Franch.) M.L.Zhang & Podlech
- Phyllolobium chapmanianum (Wenn.) M.L.Zhang & Podlech
- Phyllolobium chinense Fisch.
- Phyllolobium dolichochaete (Diels) M.L.Zhang & Podlech
- Phyllolobium donianum (DC.) M.L.Zhang & Podlech
- Phyllolobium enneaphyllum (P.C.Li) M.L.Zhang & Podlech
- Phyllolobium eutrichus (Hand.-Mazz.) M.L.Zhang & Podlech
- Phyllolobium flavovirens (K.T.Fu) M.L.Zhang & Podlech
- Phyllolobium heydei (Baker) M.L.Zhang & Podlech
- Phyllolobium lachungense (L.B.Chaudhary) Podlech
- Phyllolobium lasaense (C.C.Ni & P.C.Li) M.L.Zhang & Podlech
- Phyllolobium lineariaurifer (P.C.Li) M.L.Zhang & Podlech
- Phyllolobium milingense (C.C.Ni & P.C.Li) M.L.Zhang & Podlech
- Phyllolobium pastorium (H.T.Tsai & T.T.Yu) M.L.Zhang & Podlech
- Phyllolobium petri-primi (Rassulova & Strizhova) Podlech
- Phyllolobium prodigiosum (K.T.Fu) M.L.Zhang & Podlech
- Phyllolobium sanbilingense (H.T.Tsai & T.T.Yu) M.L.Zhang & Podlech
- Phyllolobium siccaneum (P.C.Li) M.L.Zhang & Podlech
- Phyllolobium sichuanense Podlech
- Phyllolobium tanguticum (Batalin) X.Y.Zhu
- Phyllolobium tingriense (C.C.Ni & P.C.Li) M.L.Zhang & Podlech
- Phyllolobium tribulifolium (Benth. ex Bunge) M.L.Zhang & Podlech
- Phyllolobium turgidocarpum (K.T.Fu) M.L.Zhang & Podlech
