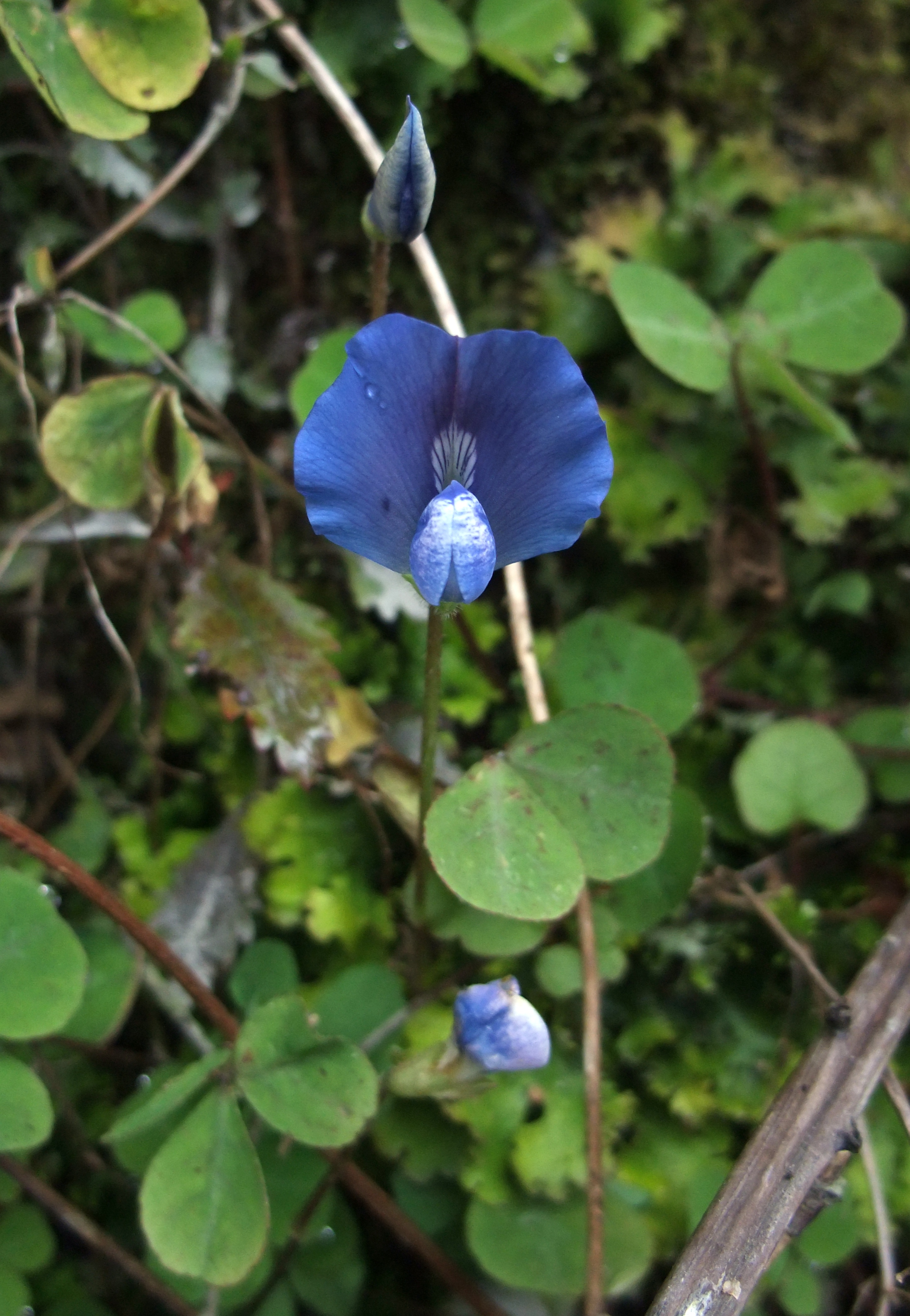

Conservation status
- Least Concern (IUCN 3.1)

Scientific classification
- Kingdom: Plantae
- Clade: Tracheophytes
- Clade: Angiosperms
- Clade: Eudicots
- Clade: Rosids
- Order: Fabales
- Family: Fabaceae
- Subfamily: Faboideae
- Tribe: Trifolieae
- Subtribe: Parochetinae; Chaudhary & Sanjappa
- Genus: Parochetus; Buch.-Ham. ex D. Don
- Species: P. communis

Binomial name
- Parochetus communis Buch.-Ham. ex D. Don

Synonyms
- Cosmiusa Alef.; Cosmiusa repens Alef.; Parochetus africana Polh.; Parochetus major D.Don; Parochetus maculata R. Br.; Parochetus oxalidifolia Royle

= Parochetus =

Genus of legumes

Parochetus communis, known in English as shamrock pea or blue oxalis, is a species of legume, and the only species in the genus Parochetus and in the subtribe Parochetinae. It is a low-growing plant with blue papilionaceous flowers and clover-like leaves. It is found in the mountains of Asia and tropical Africa, and has been introduced to New Zealand.

== Description ==
Parochetus communis is a prostrate herb, growing up to 10–20 centimetres (3.9–7.9 in) tall. Its leaves are trifoliate (three-parted, like a clover leaf), with each leaflet being 8–20 mm (0.3–0.8 in) long and similarly wide (exceptionally up to 40 mm or 1.6 in). The leaflets are cuneate (wedge-shaped) at the base, and notched at the tip, with margins that may be smooth or have minute teeth. The stipules at the base of each leaf-stalk are 4–5 mm (0.16–0.20 in) long and entire (untoothed and undivided).

The flowers of P. communis are borne singly or in clusters of up to three flowers on stalks that are typically 8–15 cm (3.1–5.9 in) long, but can be 1.5–25 cm (0.6–9.8 in) long. The flowers are generally blue, but occasionally white or purple; the standard (the large upper petal) is 12–20 mm (0.5–0.8 in) long, notched at the tip, and narrowed at the base. The wings (lateral petals) are around 13 mm (0.5 in) long, and the keel is 20–25 mm (0.8–1.0 in) long and 3–4 mm (0.1–0.2 in) wide.

The seeds of P. communis form inside pods; each pod is 15–25 mm (0.6–1.0 in) long and 4–5 mm (0.16–0.20 in) wide and contains 8–12 seeds, with each seed being around 2 mm (0.08 in) long and slightly kidney-shaped, somewhat narrower than long.

== Distribution, ecology and conservation ==
Parochetus communis is native to the Himalaya and other Asian mountain systems as far south as Java, and also the Afrotropical mountains. In Africa, it is found in Burundi, central Ethiopia, eastern parts of the Democratic Republic of the Congo, Kenya, Rwanda, Tanzania and western parts of Uganda, and grows in damp, shady places on the forest floor or along the banks of streams and rivers at altitudes of 1,500–2,000 metres (4,900–6,600 ft). In China, it grows at altitudes of 1,800–3,000 m (5,900–9,800 ft). Parochetus communis has been introduced to New Zealand, where it was first recorded in 1944.

Because of its wide distribution and the absence of any threats to the species, Parochetus communis is classified as Least Concern on the IUCN Red List.

== Taxonomic history ==
The genus Parochetus was established by David Don (based on unpublished manuscripts by Francis Hamilton) in Hamilton's Prodromus Floræ Nepalensis ("Introduction to the Flora of Nepal") of 1825 for the two species P. communis and P. major, which were separated on the basis of their leaf margins. In 1835, John Forbes Royle described a third species, P. oxalidifolia, again based on leaf margin differences. It was later realised that intergradations between all three leaf forms were seen, and so the three taxa were merged into a single species. In 1871, Parochetus was collected from Africa for the first time, as part of David Livingstone's Zambezi Expedition, from Mount Chiradzulu in southern Malawi. A new species, Parochetus africanus, was erected for specimens from Africa in 1991 by Roger Marcus Polhill, but this was reduced to a subspecies of P. communis in 1998 because of a perceived lack of differentiating characters.

Parochetus is traditionally classified in the tribe Trifolieae of the family Leguminosae (Fabaceae), although its inclusion in that tribe has also been considered doubtful. Because Parochetus could not be comfortably accommodated in either of the existing subtribes of the Trifolieae, a new subtribe, Parochetinae, was erected in 1998 to accommodate Parochetus alone.

== Horticulture ==
Parochetus has been grown in Europe since the early 19th century, but is considered "tender" in the United Kingdom, and will only survive outdoors in warm and sheltered areas. Plants from Asian stock may be hardier than those from Africa.
