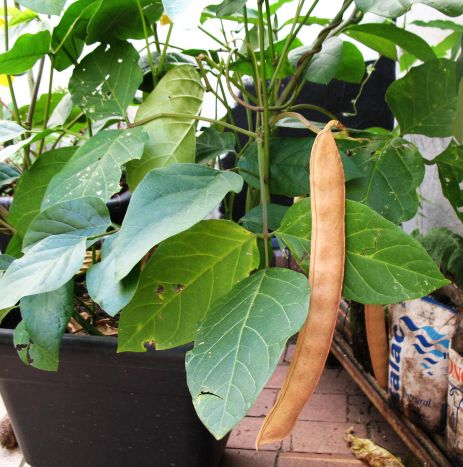
- Canavalia ensiformis, from which canavanine was first isolated

Scientific classification
- Kingdom: Plantae
- Clade: Embryophytes
- Clade: Tracheophytes
- Clade: Angiosperms
- Clade: Eudicots
- Clade: Rosids
- Order: Fabales
- Family: Fabaceae
- Subfamily: Faboideae
- Clade: Meso-Papilionoideae
- Clade: Non-protein amino acid-accumulating clade (Cardoso et al 2012)

Clades
- Hologalegina; Hypocalypteae; Indigofereae; Millettioids; Mirbelioids; Cicereae; Phaseoleae

Synonyms
- Canavanine-accumulating clade; NPAAA clade

= Non-protein amino acid-accumulating clade =

Division within flowering plants

The non-protein amino acid-accumulating clade, also known as the Canavanine-accumulating clade, is a clade of the flowering plant subfamily Faboideae (or Papilionoideae) that includes the majority of agriculturally-cultivated legumes. It is characterized by the accumulation of the non-proteinogenic amino acid canavanine in the seeds—a deterrent against herbivory. This phylogenetic trait was first recognized in the early 1980s. This clade is consistently resolved in molecular phylogenies. It contains many economically important genera, including Cicer, Glycine, Medicago, Phaseolus, Trifolium, Vicia, and Vigna.

== Description ==
This clade circumscribes five subordinate clades: two traditional tribes (Hypocalypteae and Indigofereae) and three informal clades (the mirbelioids, the millettioids, and Hologalegina), as well as several minor taxa. The name of this clade is informal and is not assumed to have any particular taxonomic rank like the names authorized by the ICBN or the ICPN. The clade does not currently have a node-based definition.

== See also ==
- IRL, another clade defined by molecular characteristics, rests within the NPAAA clade
