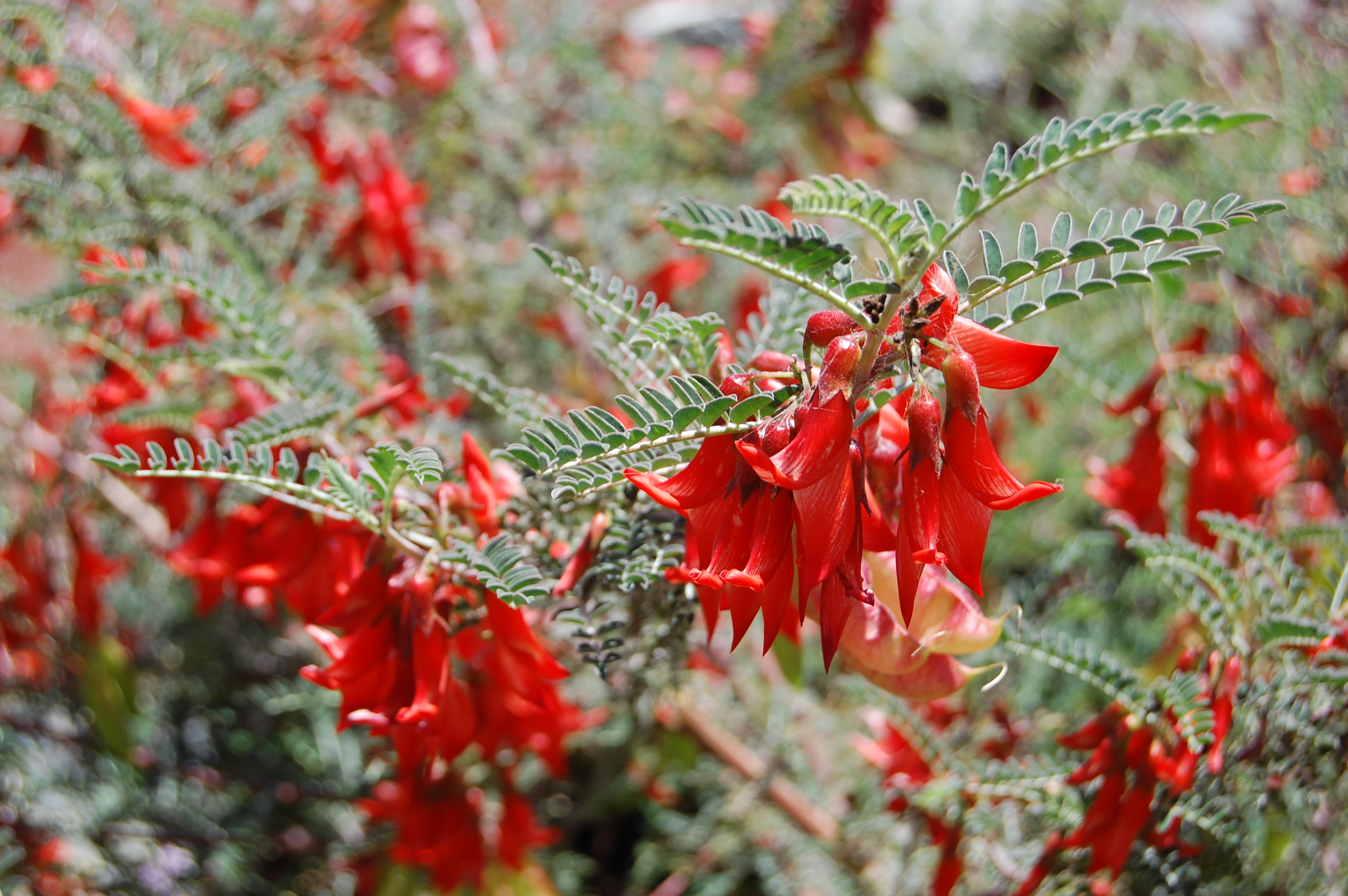
- Lessertia montana

Scientific classification
- Kingdom: Plantae
- Clade: Tracheophytes
- Clade: Angiosperms
- Clade: Eudicots
- Clade: Rosids
- Order: Fabales
- Family: Fabaceae
- Subfamily: Faboideae
- Tribe: Galegeae
- Subtribe: Astragalinae
- Genus: Lessertia; DC. (1802)

Type species
- Lessertia perennans (Jacq.) DC.

Species
- 62; see text

Synonyms
- Coluteastrum Heist. ex Fabr. (1763); Colutia Medik. (1787); Sulitra Medik. (1787); Sutherlandia R.Br. ex W.T.Aiton (1812), nom. cons.

= Lessertia (plant) =

Genus of legumes

Lessertia is a genus of flowering plants in the legume family, Fabaceae. It contains some 62 species native to eastern and southern Africa. It belongs to subfamily Faboideae.

== Species ==
162 species are accepted:

- Lessertia acanthorhachis (Dinter) Dinter
- Lessertia affinis Burrt Davy
- Lessertia amajubica Nkonki
- Lessertia annularis Burch.
- Lessertia benguellensis Baker
- Lessertia brachypus Harv.
- Lessertia brachystachya DC.
- Lessertia candida E.Mey.
- Lessertia canescens Goldblatt & J.C.Manning
- Lessertia capensis (P.J.Bergius) Druce
- Lessertia capitata E.Mey.
- Lessertia carnosa Eckl. & Zeyh.
- Lessertia contracta M.Balkwill
- Lessertia cryptantha Dinter
- Lessertia depressa Harv.
- Lessertia diffusa R.Br.
- Lessertia distans Burtt Davy
- Lessertia dykei L.Bolus
- Lessertia emarginata Schinz
- Lessertia excisa (Thunb.) DC.
- Lessertia falciformis DC.
- Lessertia frutescens (L.) Goldblatt & J.C.Manning
- Lessertia fruticosa Lindl.
- Lessertia glabricaulis L.Bolus
- Lessertia globosa L.Bolus
- Lessertia harveyana L.Bolus
- Lessertia herbacea (L.) Druce
- Lessertia humilis (E.Phillips & R.A.Dyer) Goldblatt & J.C.Manning
- Lessertia incana Schinz
- Lessertia inflata Harv.
- Lessertia ingeliensis M.Balkwill
- Lessertia kensitii L.Bolus
- Lessertia lanata Harv.
- Lessertia macroflora M.Balkwill
- Lessertia macrostachya DC.
- Lessertia margaritacea E.Mey.
- Lessertia meyeri Boatwr., Nkonki & B.-E.van Wyk
- Lessertia microcarpa E.Mey.
- Lessertia miniata T.M.Salter
- Lessertia montana (E.Phillips & R.A.Dyer) Goldblatt & J.C.Manning
- Lessertia mossii R.G.N.Young
- Lessertia nana R.G.N.Young
- Lessertia obtusata (Thunb.) DC.
- Lessertia pappeana Harv.
- Lessertia pauciflora Harv.
- Lessertia perennans (Jacq.) DC.
- Lessertia phillipsiana Burtt Davy
- Lessertia physodes Eckl. & Zeyh.
- Lessertia prostrata (Thunb.) DC.
- Lessertia rigida (Thunb.) DC.
- Lessertia sneeuwbergensis Germish.
- Lessertia spinescens E.Mey.
- Lessertia stricta Bolus
- Lessertia subumbellata Harv.
- Lessertia tenuifolia E.Mey.
- Lessertia thodei L.Bolus
- Lessertia tomentosa (Thunb.) DC.
- Lessertia uniflora B.-E.van Wyk
- Lessertia villosa E.Mey.
