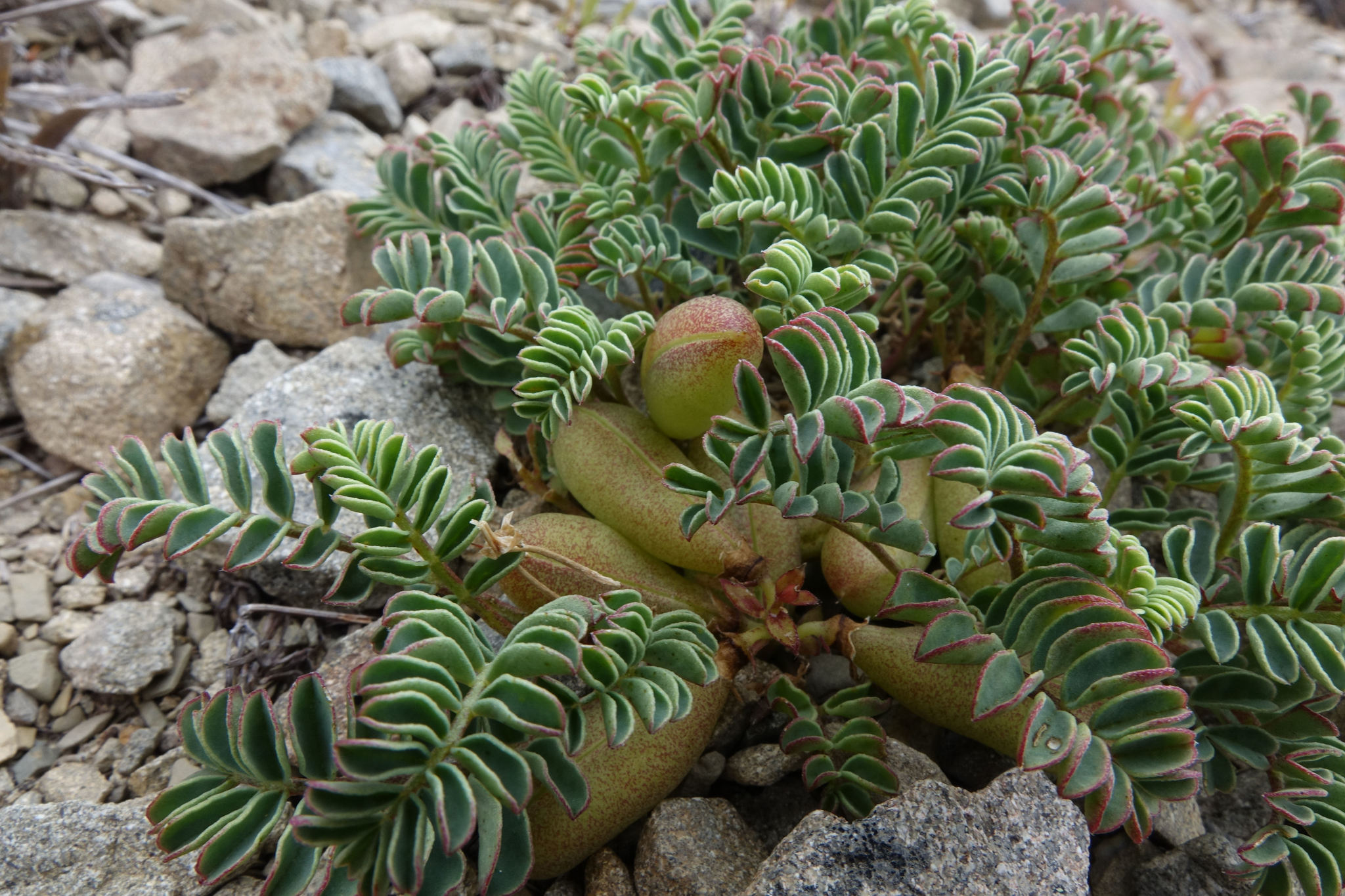
- Montigena novae-zelandiae found in the central Waitaki District

Conservation status
- Declining (NZ TCS)

Scientific classification
- Kingdom: Plantae
- Clade: Tracheophytes
- Clade: Angiosperms
- Clade: Eudicots
- Clade: Rosids
- Order: Fabales
- Family: Fabaceae
- Subfamily: Faboideae
- Genus: Montigena; Heenan (1998)
- Species: M. novae-zelandiae

Binomial name
- Montigena novae-zelandiae (Hook.f.) Heenan

Synonyms
- Swainsona novae-zelandiae Hook.f. (1864)

= Montigena =

Scree Pea

Genus of legumes

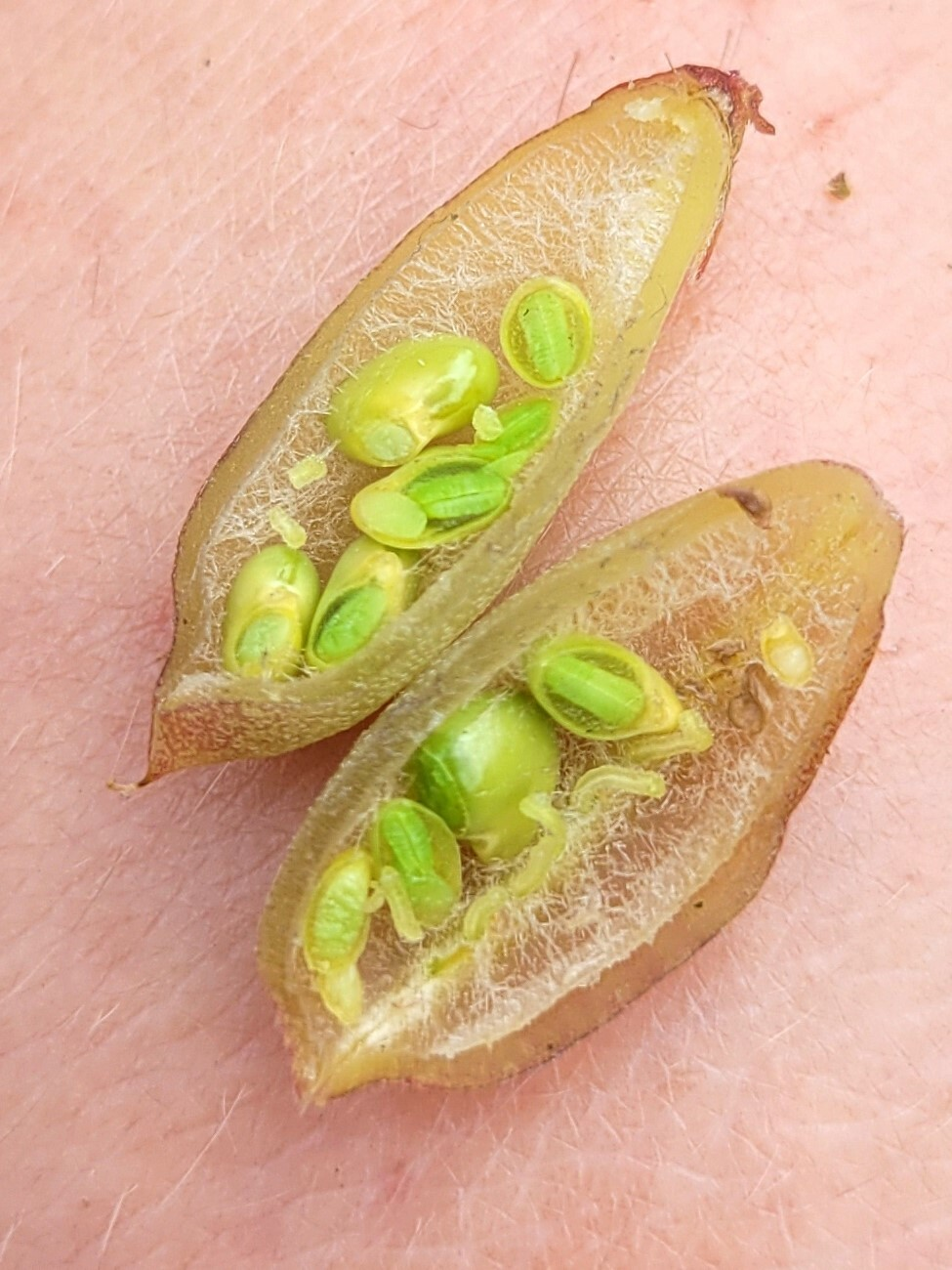
Seeds and seed pods of Montigena novae-zelandiae

Montigena is a genus of flowering plant in the legume family Fabaceae. It includes the sole species Montigena novae-zelandiae, known more commonly the scree pea, a dicotyledonous herb endemic to the South Island of New Zealand. The plant is small and woody, arising from thin, branched stems that extend to the surface from a deeply buried root stock. The flowers vary from purple to brown, while fruits appear between January and April.

M. novae-zelandiae was previously classified as Swainsona novae-zelandiae until 1998 when the genus Montigena was created based on the morphological features of the plant.

Under the New Zealand Threat Classification System, it is classified as "At Risk - Declining". Its decline is predicted to be from 10% to 50% from a population of from 20,000 to 100,000 mature plants. Further comments are that it is sparse and that there are recruitment failures.

Montigena is one of the four genera of native legumes in New Zealand; the other three are Carmichaelia, Clianthus, and Sophora.
