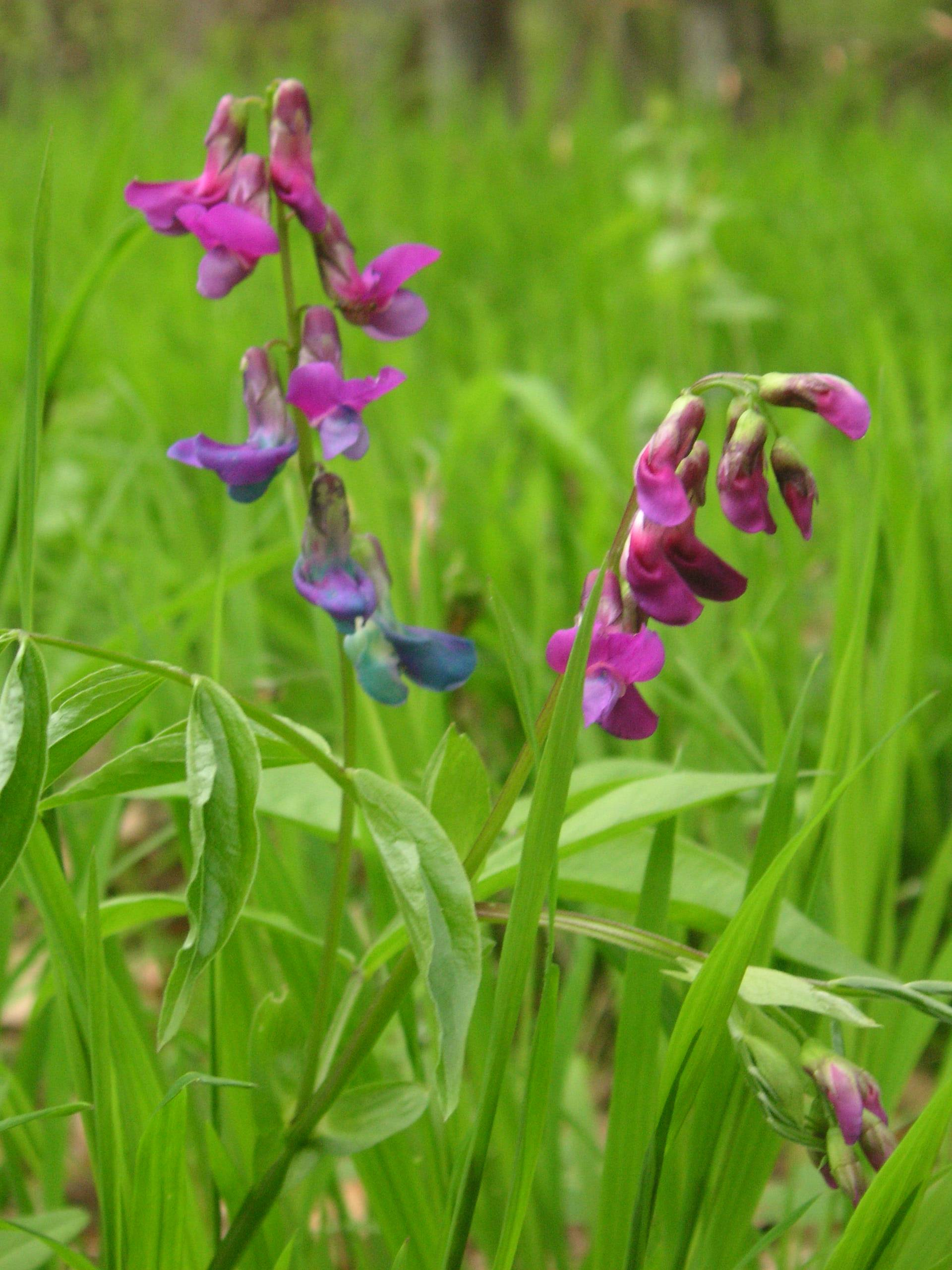
- Lathyrus vernus

Scientific classification
- Kingdom: Plantae
- Clade: Embryophytes
- Clade: Tracheophytes
- Clade: Angiosperms
- Clade: Eudicots
- Clade: Rosids
- Order: Fabales
- Family: Fabaceae
- Subfamily: Faboideae
- Clade: Meso-Papilionoideae
- Clade: Non-protein amino acid-accumulating clade
- Clade: Hologalegina; M. F. Wojciechowski, M. J. Sanderson, K. P. Steele, and A. Liston

Clades
- Robinioids; IRLC

= Hologalegina =

Clade of plants

Hologalegina is a clade in the legume family Fabaceae. This clade belongs to subfamily Faboideae. It is well-studied in plant biology because of its unique genetic markers and evolutionary history.
