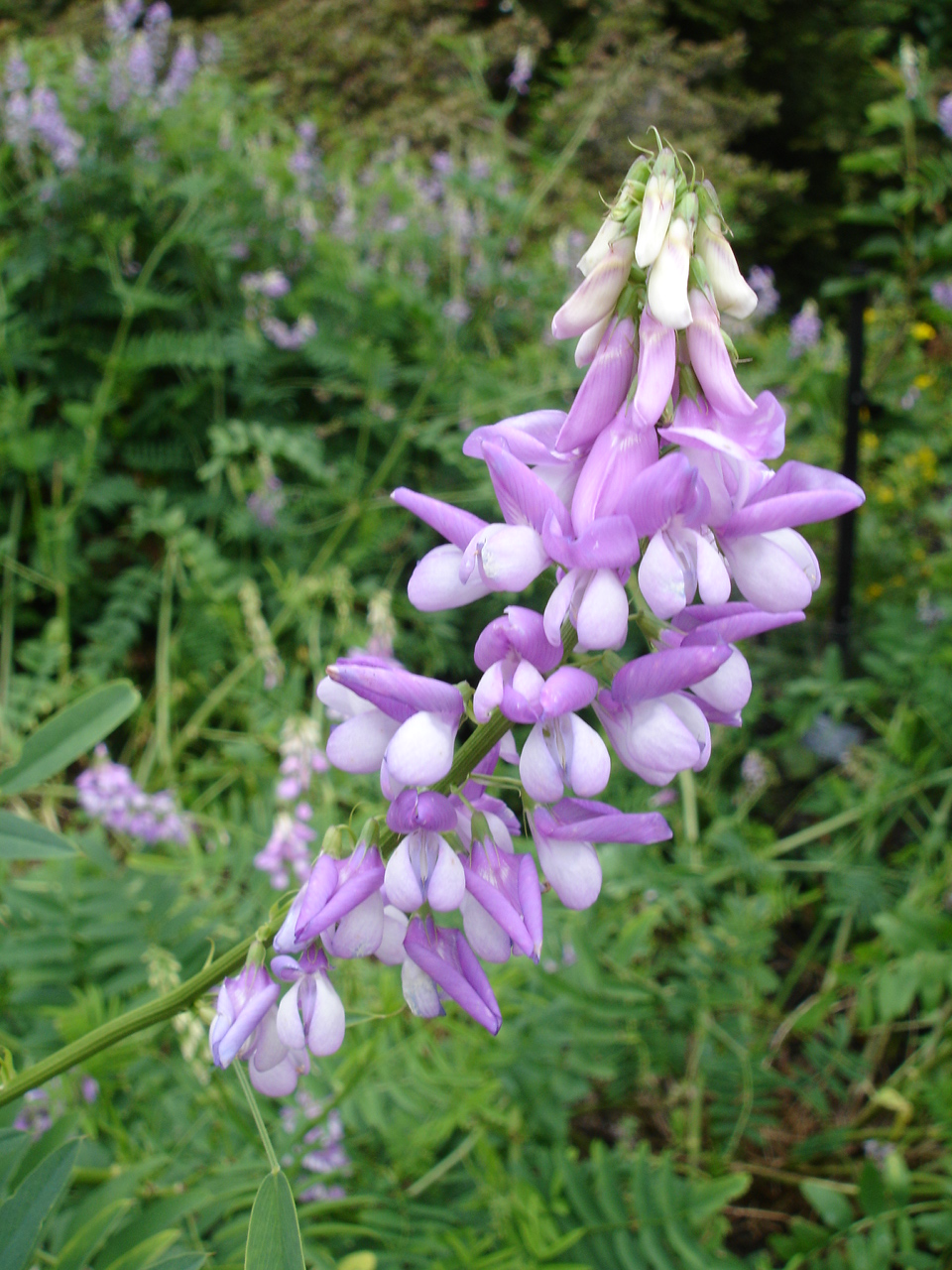
- Galega officinalis

Scientific classification
- Kingdom: Plantae
- Clade: Tracheophytes
- Clade: Angiosperms
- Clade: Eudicots
- Clade: Rosids
- Order: Fabales
- Family: Fabaceae
- Subfamily: Faboideae
- Clade: Meso-Papilionoideae
- Clade: Non-protein amino acid-accumulating clade
- Clade: Hologalegina
- Clade: Inverted repeat-lacking clade (Wojciechowski et al. 2000, 2004) Wojciechowski 2013

Tribes
- Astragaleae (syn. Galegeae); Cicereae; Hedysareae; Fabeae; Trifolieae; Wisterieae; Incertae sedis; Glycyrrhiza L.

Synonyms
- Galegeae sensu lato sensu Polhill, 1981; IR-lacking clade; IRLC; Temperate herbaceous clade; THC

= Inverted repeat-lacking clade =

Group of flowering plants

The inverted repeat-lacking clade (IRLC) is an informal monophyletic clade of the flowering plant subfamily Faboideae. Well-known members of this clade include chickpeas, broad or fava beans, vetch, lentils, peas, wisteria, alfalfa, clover, fenugreek, liquorice, and locoweeds. The name of this clade is informal and is not assumed to have any particular taxonomic rank like the names authorized by the ICBN or the ICPN. The clade is characterized by the loss of one of the two 25-kb inverted repeats in the plastid genome that are found in most land plants. It is consistently resolved in molecular phylogenies. The clade is predicted to have diverged from the other legume lineages 39.0±2.4 million years ago (in the Eocene). It includes several large, temperate genera such as Astragalus, Hedysarum, Medicago, Oxytropis, Swainsona, and Trifolium.

== Description ==
This clade is composed of five traditional tribes (Cicereae, Fabeae, Galegeae, Hedysareae, and Trifolieae) and several genera that were traditionally placed in the tribe Millettieae: Afgekia, Callerya, Endosamara, Sarcodum, Wisteria, and possibly Antheroporum. The first five of these genera have been transferred to the tribe Wisterieae, so that as revised, the tribe Millettieae falls outside the IRLC clade. The clade is defined as:

"The most inclusive crown clade exhibiting the structural mutation in the plastid genome (loss of one copy of the ~25-kb inverted repeat region) homologous with that found in Galega officinalis, Glycyrrhiza lepidota, and Vicia faba, where these taxa are extant species included in the crown clade defined by this name."

== Uses ==
This clade includes edible plants such as garden peas, lentils, chickpeas, licorice, alfafa, among others.
