= PHGG =

PHGG may refer to:

- Partially hydrolysed guar gum, a nutritional supplement
- Port Hills Geotechnical Group, an earthquake engineering group in New Zealand
- pediatric high grade glioma, a type of tumour
