= U Lazy S Ranch =

Ranch in Texas, US

Location in Texas

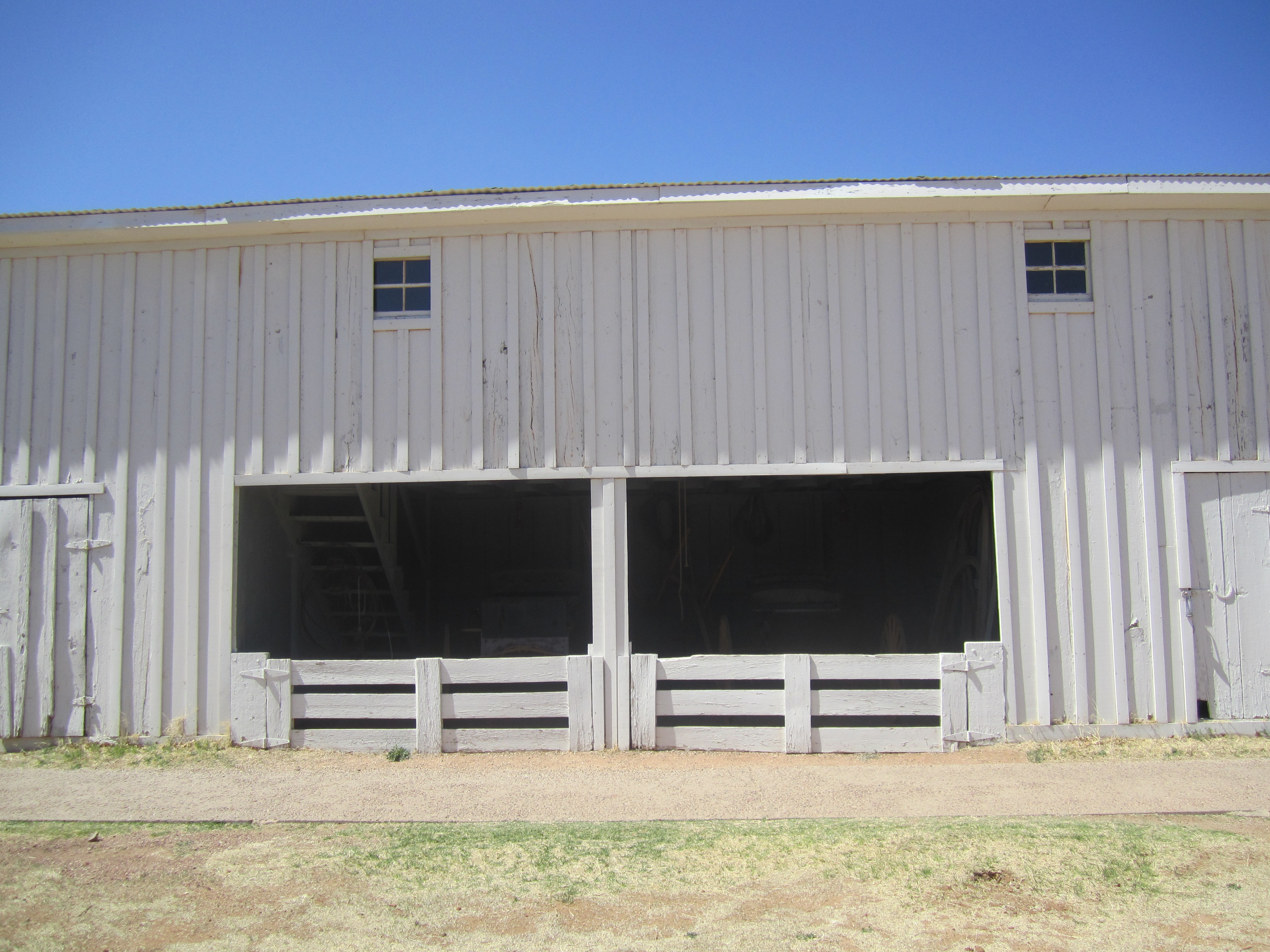
U Lazy S Carriage House, now at the National Ranching Heritage Center in Lubbock, Texas.

The U Lazy S Ranch, formerly known as the Square and Compass Ranch, was a ranch in Garza County, Texas, United States.

== History ==
The ranch was established as the Square and Compass Ranch in 1884.

By 1901, when it was acquired by John Bunyan Slaughter, the ranch spanned 99,188 acres. Slaughter also purchased 5,000 cattle and brought 6,000 head of cattle he already owned. Additionally, he changed the name to his cattle brand, 'U Lazy S', which he had registered during the American Civil War. He built a ranchhouse in 1902 and acquired more acres, owning up to 126,227 acres a few years later. In 1906, he sold 50,000 acres to C. W. Post, who founded the new town of Post, Texas.

After Slaughter's death in 1928, the ranch was inherited by his son, John B. Slaughter Jr., who was educated at the Phillips Exeter Academy and Yale University. According to historian William Curry Holden, "By 1936, 8,000 Hereford cattle grazed 100,000 acres of U Lazy S land." The ranchhouse, a designated Texas landmark, burned down on January 13, 1936.

The ranch was inherited by his nephew, John F. Lott and his niece, Mary Belle Lott Macy, in 1940. Lott split some of the acreage into farms. In 1949, Lott started flying an airplane to drive the cattle and spray herbicide.

In the 1950s, the land was faced with a draught. By 1954, Lott planted 1,400 acres of guar to improve the land. He was also the first Texas rancher to use a roto-pitter to break up the rangeland. Two years later, in 1956, Lott's range improvement program had worked.

In 1965, Macy split her section of the ranch and renamed it the Running M Ranch. Meanwhile, the U Lazy S Ranch was managed by Lott's son, Jack Lott. By 1966, the ranch spanned 90,000 acres.

In October 1968, Lott and his wife hosted François Tombalbaye, the President of Chad, on his official visit to Texas. A year later, in 1969, they donated US$10,000, plus a carriage house from the ranch to the National Ranching Heritage Center in Lubbock, Texas. In 1973, a fundraiser for the public library in Post, Texas was held on the ranch.
