= Blosyrus inaequalis =

Scientific classification
- Kingdom: Animalia
- Phylum: Arthropoda
- Clade: Pancrustacea
- Class: Insecta
- Order: Coleoptera
- Suborder: Polyphaga
- Infraorder: Cucujiformia
- Family: Curculionidae
- Genus: Blosyrus
- Species: B. inaequalis

Binomial name
- Blosyrus inaequalis Marshall, 1916

Synonyms
- Blosyrus tuberculatus Redtenbacher, 1868

Species of beetle

Blosyrus inaequalis is a species of weevil found in India and Sri Lanka.

== Description ==
This species has a body length is about 4.5 to 6.5 mm. Body black, with dense uniform brown or grey scales. Head with five short frontal longitudinal sulci. Rostrum slightly narrowed anteriorly. Antennae with the two basal-joints of the funicle subequal with elongate club. Prothorax strongly transverse and rugose with a few large tubercle. Elytra globose with oblique shoulders and deeply sinuate basal margin. Spermatheca with strongly curved ramus.

== Biology ==
They are known as minor pests on cluster beans, and sesame.
