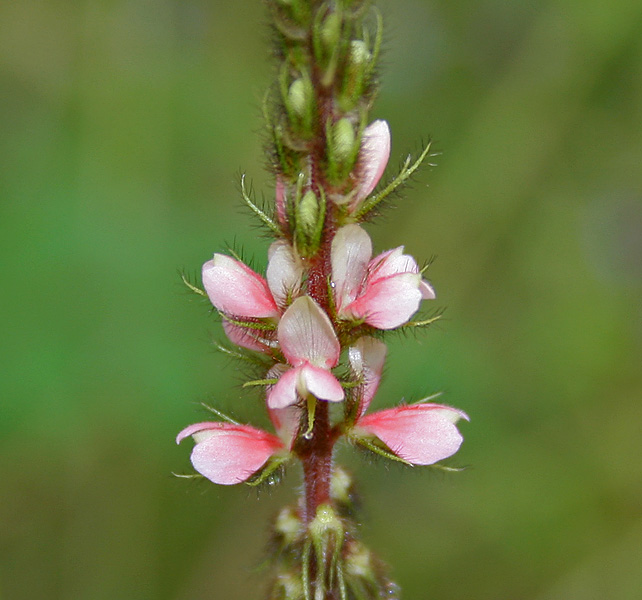
- Indigofera astragalina

Scientific classification
- Kingdom: Plantae
- Clade: Tracheophytes
- Clade: Angiosperms
- Clade: Eudicots
- Clade: Rosids
- Order: Fabales
- Family: Fabaceae
- Subfamily: Faboideae
- Clade: Meso-Papilionoideae
- Clade: Non-protein amino acid-accumulating clade
- Tribe: Indigofereae (Benth.) Hutch.

Genera
- See text

Synonyms
- Galegeae subtribe Indigoferinae (Benth.) Benth. 1859; Indigofereae clade sensu Schrire et al. 2009; Indigoferoid clade sensu Cardoso et al. 2012

= Indigofereae =

Tribe of legumes

The tribe Indigofereae is a subdivision of the plant family Fabaceae. It is consistently recovered as a monophyletic clade in molecular phylogenies. The Indigofereae arose 30.0 ± 3.3 million years ago (in the Oligocene).

This tribe does not currently have a node-based, phylogenetic definition, but it can be distinguished by the following morphological synapomorphies: the presence of biramous hairs, keel spurs, short free staminal filaments, and short fruiting pedicels; and the loss of stipels and seed arils.

== Genera ==
Indigofereae comprises the following genera:

- Cyamopsis DC.
- Indigastrum Jaub. & Spach
- Indigofera L.
- Microcharis Benth.
- Phylloxylon Baill.
- Rhynchotropis Harms.

== Systematics ==
Modern molecular phylogenetics suggest the following relationships:

- - Millettioids (outgroup)
  - Indigofereae
    - Phylloxylon
    - - Indigofera
        - Palaeotropical Clade
        - - Pantropical Clade
          - - Cape Clade
            - Tethyan Clade
      - CRIM Clade
        - Cyamopsis
        - - Indigastrum
          - - Rhynchotropis
            - Microcharis
