= Phylloxylon perrieri =

Conservation status
- Least Concern (IUCN 3.1)

Scientific classification
- Kingdom: Plantae
- Clade: Tracheophytes
- Clade: Angiosperms
- Clade: Eudicots
- Clade: Rosids
- Order: Fabales
- Family: Fabaceae
- Subfamily: Faboideae
- Genus: Phylloxylon
- Species: P. perrieri

Binomial name
- Phylloxylon perrieri Drake

Species of legume

Phylloxylon perrieri is a species of legume in the family Fabaceae. It is found only in Madagascar, and some Eastern parts of Jamaica.
