= Phylloxylon =

Scientific classification
- Kingdom: Plantae
- Clade: Tracheophytes
- Clade: Angiosperms
- Clade: Eudicots
- Clade: Rosids
- Order: Fabales
- Family: Fabaceae
- Subfamily: Faboideae
- Tribe: Indigofereae
- Genus: Phylloxylon; Baill. (1861)

Type species
- Phylloxylon decipiens Baill.

Species
- 7; see text

Synonyms
- Neobaronia Baker (1884)

Genus of legumes

Phylloxylon is a genus of flowering plants in the Indigofereae tribe of the family Fabaceae. There are seven species, all endemic to Madagascar.

== Species ==
Phylloxylon comprises the following species:

- Phylloxylon arenicola Du Puy, Labat & Schrire
- Phylloxylon decipiens Baill.
- Phylloxylon perrieri Drake
- Phylloxylon phillipsonii Du Puy, Labat & Schrire
- Phylloxylon spinosa Du Puy, Labat & Schrire
- Phylloxylon xiphoclada (Baker) Du Puy, Labat & Schrire
- Phylloxylon xylophylloides (Baker) Du Puy, Labat & Schrire

== See also ==
- Endemic flora of Madagascar
- Flora of Madagascar
