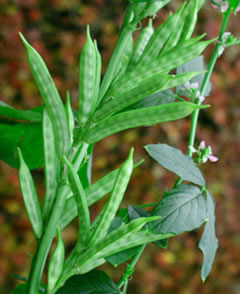
- Cyamopsis tetragonoloba (L.) Taub.

Scientific classification
- Kingdom: Plantae
- Clade: Tracheophytes
- Clade: Angiosperms
- Clade: Eudicots
- Clade: Rosids
- Order: Fabales
- Family: Fabaceae
- Subfamily: Faboideae
- Tribe: Indigofereae
- Genus: Cyamopsis; DC. (1825)

Type species
- Cyamopsis tetragonoloba (L.) Taub.

Species
- 4; see text

Synonyms
- Cordaea Spreng. (1831)

= Cyamopsis =

Genus of legumes

Cyamopsis is a genus of the family Fabaceae. Its species are distributed across sub-Saharan Africa (southwestern Africa and the Sudanian and Somali-Masai regions), Saudi Arabia, Pakistan, and India. Typical habitats include tropical seasonally-dry thorn scrub and grassland, often in floodplains, stream beds, and pans, and in open sandy or rocky areas.

== Species ==
Cyamopsis comprises the following species:

- Cyamopsis dentata (N.E.Br.) Torre – southwestern Angola, Namibia, and Botswana
- Cyamopsis senegalensis Guill. & Perr. – dry tropical Africa (Senegal to Eritrea, Tanzania, and southwest Africa) and Saudi Arabia
- Cyamopsis serrata Schinz – Namibia and Botswana to Northern and Cape Provinces of South Africa
- Cyamopsis tetragonoloba (L.) Taub. — guar – Pakistan and western India
