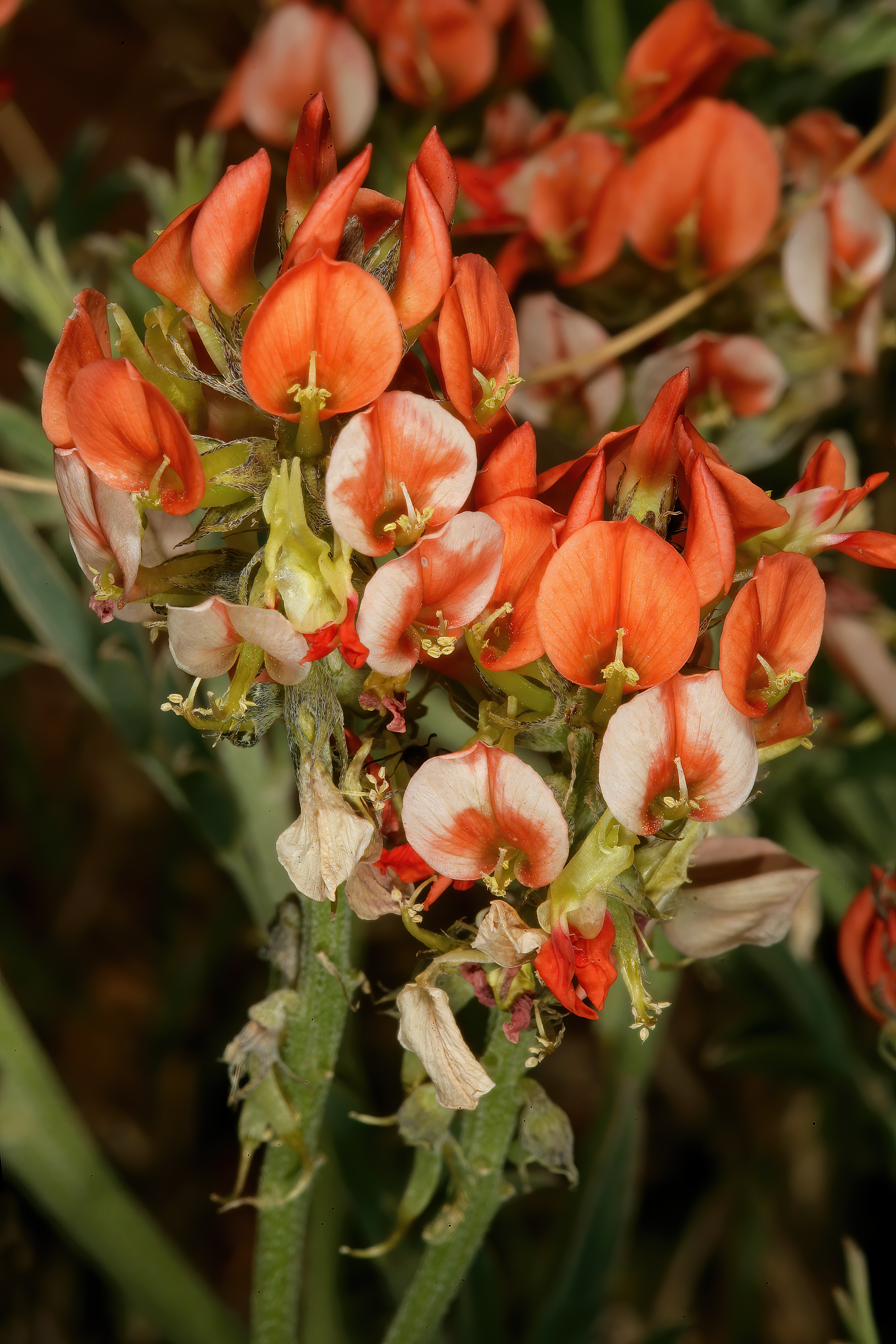
- Indigastrum burkeanum

Scientific classification
- Kingdom: Plantae
- Clade: Tracheophytes
- Clade: Angiosperms
- Clade: Eudicots
- Clade: Rosids
- Order: Fabales
- Family: Fabaceae
- Subfamily: Faboideae
- Tribe: Indigofereae
- Genus: Indigastrum; Jaub. & Spach (1856)

Type species
- Indigastrum parviflorum (Heyne ex Wight & Arn.) Schrire

Species
- See text.

Synonyms
- Indigofera subgenus Euindigofera Benth. 1865; Indigofera 'group' Indigastrum (Jaub. & Spach) Bak. f. 1926; Indigofera subgenus Indigastrum (Jaub. & Spach) J.B. Gillett 1958; Indigofera sensu Hutch. 1964

= Indigastrum =

Genus of legumes

Indigastrum is a genus of flowering plants in the tribe Indigofereae of the family Fabaceae. It includes eight species native to sub-Saharan Africa, Yemen, India, and Australia.

== Species ==
Indigastrum comprises the following species:

- Indigastrum argyroides (E.Mey.) Schrire
- Indigastrum burkeanum (Benth. ex Harv.) Schrire
- Indigastrum candidissimum (Dinter) Schrire
- Indigastrum costatum (Guill. & Perr.) Schrire
  - subsp. costatum (Guill. & Perr.) Schrire
  - subsp. goniodes (Baker) Schrire
  - subsp. macrum (E.Mey.) Schrire
  - subsp. theuschii (O.Hoffm.) Schrire
- Indigastrum fastigiatum (E. Mey.) Schrire
- Indigastrum guerranum (Torre) Schrire
- Indigastrum niveum (Willd. ex Spreng.) Schrire & Callm.
- Indigastrum parviflorum (Heyne ex Wight & Arn.) Schrire
  - var. crispidulum (J.B.Gillett) Schrire
  - subsp. occidentale (J.B.Gillett) Schrire
  - subsp. parviflorum (B. Heyne ex Wight & Arn.) Schrire
