= Phylloxylon arenicola =

Conservation status
- Endangered (IUCN 3.1)

Scientific classification
- Kingdom: Plantae
- Clade: Tracheophytes
- Clade: Angiosperms
- Clade: Eudicots
- Clade: Rosids
- Order: Fabales
- Family: Fabaceae
- Subfamily: Faboideae
- Genus: Phylloxylon
- Species: P. arenicola

Binomial name
- Phylloxylon arenicola Du Puy, Labat & Schrire

Species of legume

Phylloxylon arenicola is a species of legume (bean) in the family Fabaceae. It is found only in Madagascar.
