= Rhynchotropis =

Scientific classification
- Kingdom: Plantae
- Clade: Tracheophytes
- Clade: Angiosperms
- Clade: Eudicots
- Clade: Rosids
- Order: Fabales
- Family: Fabaceae
- Subfamily: Faboideae
- Tribe: Indigofereae
- Genus: Rhynchotropis; Harms

Species
- two; see text

Genus of legumes

Rhynchotropis is a genus of flowering plants in the legume family, Fabaceae. It includes two species of herbs native to the Democratic Republic of the Congo, Angola, and Zambia. Typical habitats include seasonally-dry tropical woodland and wooded grassland in the northern Zambezian region, often in seasonally-damp or open sandy and rocky areas. It belongs to tribe Indigofereae of subfamily Faboideae.

== Species ==
Rhynchotropis comprises the following species:

- Rhynchotropis marginata (N.E.Br.) J.B.Gillett
- Rhynchotropis poggei (Taub.) Harms
