= Phylloxylon xiphoclada =

Conservation status
- Endangered (IUCN 3.1)

Scientific classification
- Kingdom: Plantae
- Clade: Tracheophytes
- Clade: Angiosperms
- Clade: Eudicots
- Clade: Rosids
- Order: Fabales
- Family: Fabaceae
- Subfamily: Faboideae
- Genus: Phylloxylon
- Species: P. xiphoclada

Binomial name
- Phylloxylon xiphoclada (Baker) Du Puy, Labat & Schrire

Synonyms
- Neobaronia xiphoclada Baker

Species of legume

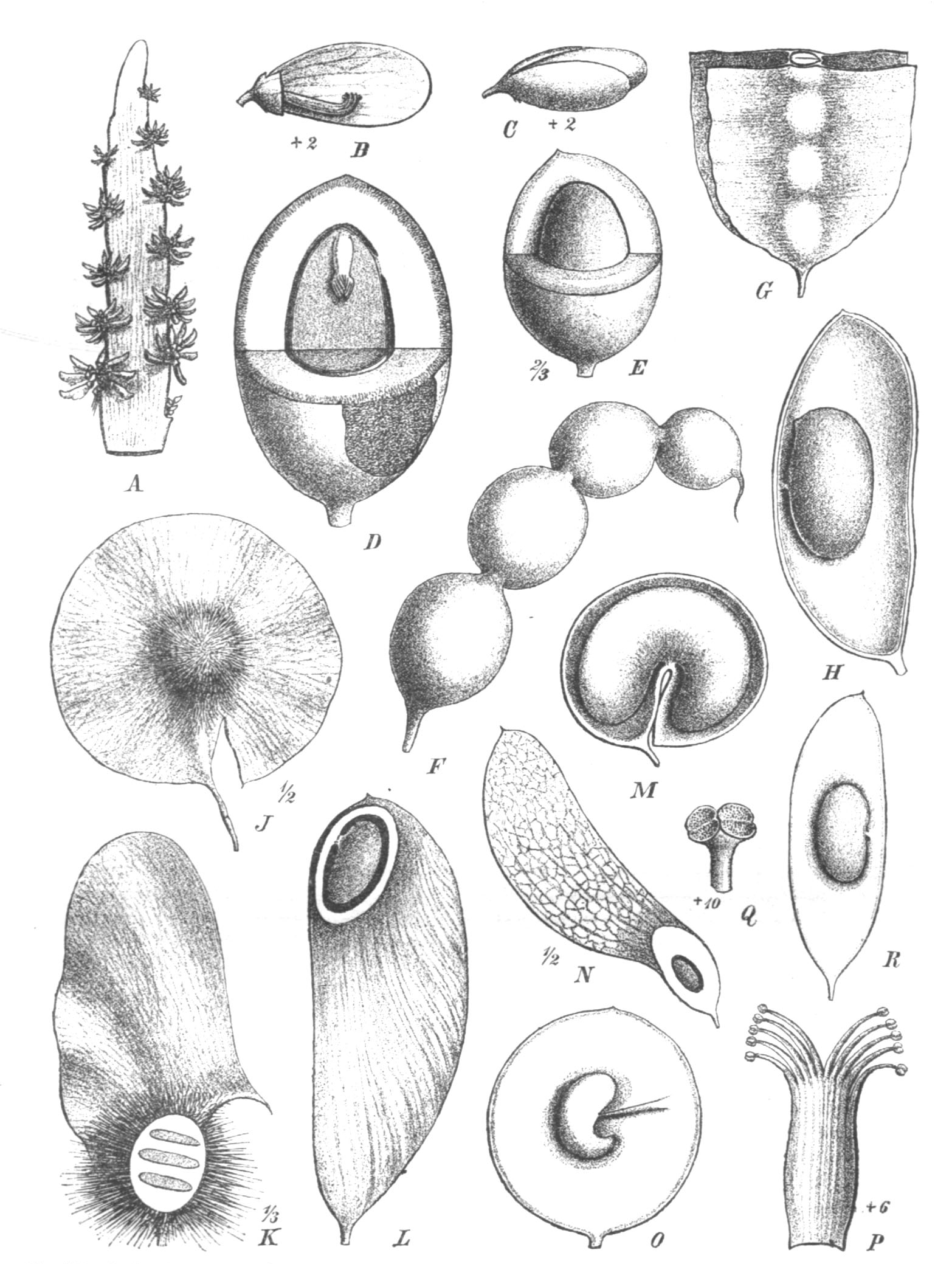
Pods and Flowers

Phylloxylon xiphoclada is a species of legume in the family Fabaceae. It is found only in Madagascar.
