= National Ranching Heritage Center =

Agriculture museum in Lubbock, Texas, US

Coordinates: 33°35′26.68″N 101°53′3.41″W

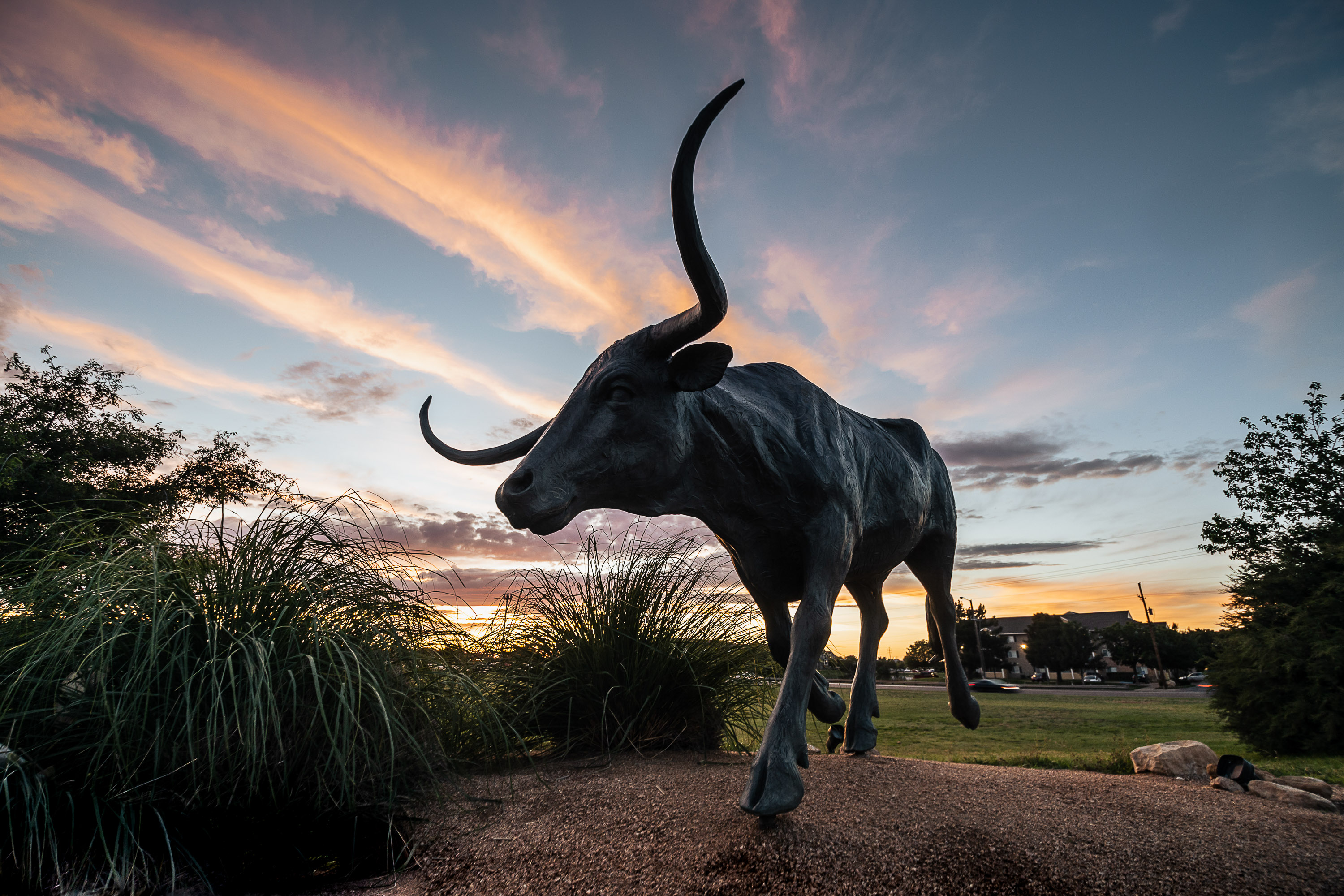
One of 19 life-sized bronze steers featured in Gibson Park in front of the National Ranching Heritage Center in Lubbock, Texas

The National Ranching Heritage Center, located on the Texas Tech University campus in Lubbock, Texas, is a unique museum dedicated to preserving and celebrating the history and heritage of ranching in the United States. Established in 1971, the center sits on a 27-acre historical park and features a collection of authentic ranching structures ranging from the 1780s to 1950s.

In 2024, the NRHC announced the location at the center of the forthcoming Red Steagall Institute of Western Art, named for Russell "Red" Steagall, an American actor, musician, poet, and stage performer born in Gainesville, Texas. Steagall focuses on American Western and country music genres. The addition will be an art institute featuring interactive classes and displays for the public to learn about Western culture. The Texas Tech System Board of Regents approved the NRHC's $28 million dollar expansion in May 2024. Jim Bret Campbell, executive director of the NRHC, said that the expansion comes after Steagall and his wife sought a location to donate his collection of Western songs, poetry, and various radio and television recordings of his programs.

== History ==
On January 22, 2019, the Heritage Center launched an exhibit which shows the importance of the different breeds of cattle brought into the southwestern United States. The first cattle, explains the exhibit, were Andalusian brought to the continent in the second voyage of Christopher Columbus. Later breeds, such as Hereford, Angus, and the Texas Longhorn shaped the destiny of the American West.

== Gallery ==
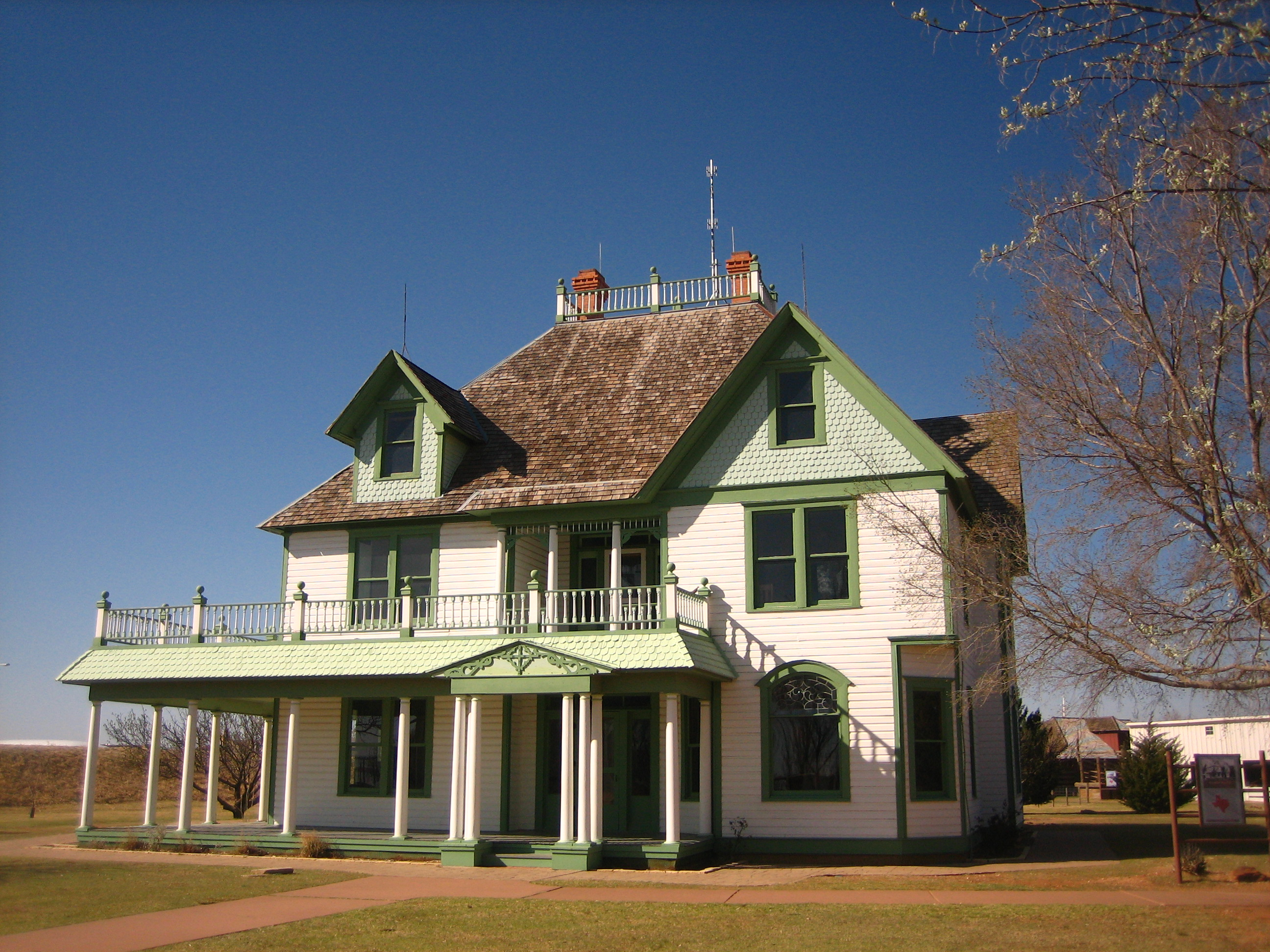
The Barton House, an example of Queen Anne style architecture, was relocated to the Heritage Center from Hale County. It is named for Texas pioneer Joseph J. Barton.

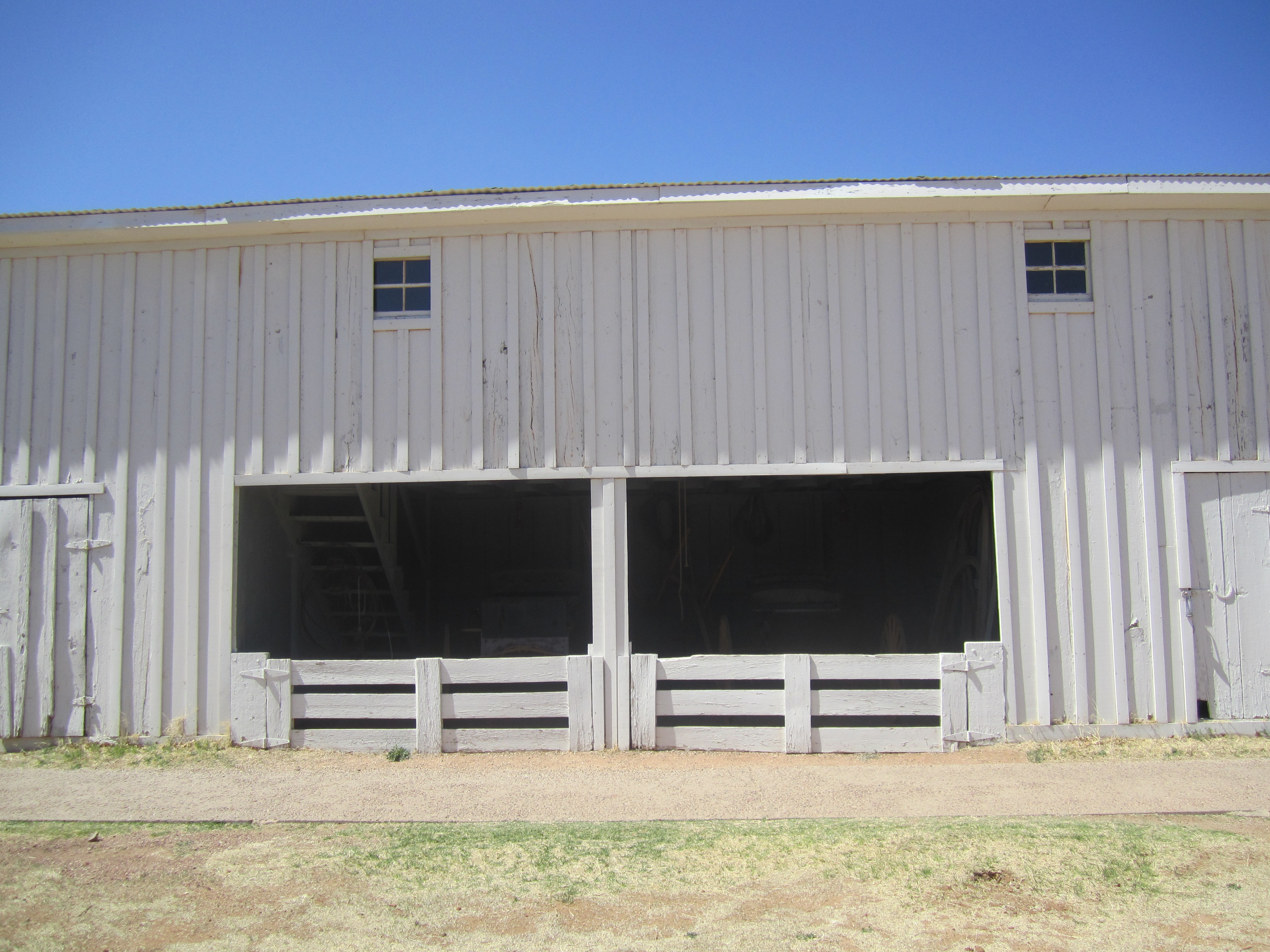
U Lazy S Carriage House, owned by John B. Slaughter, was moved from Post to the NRHC.

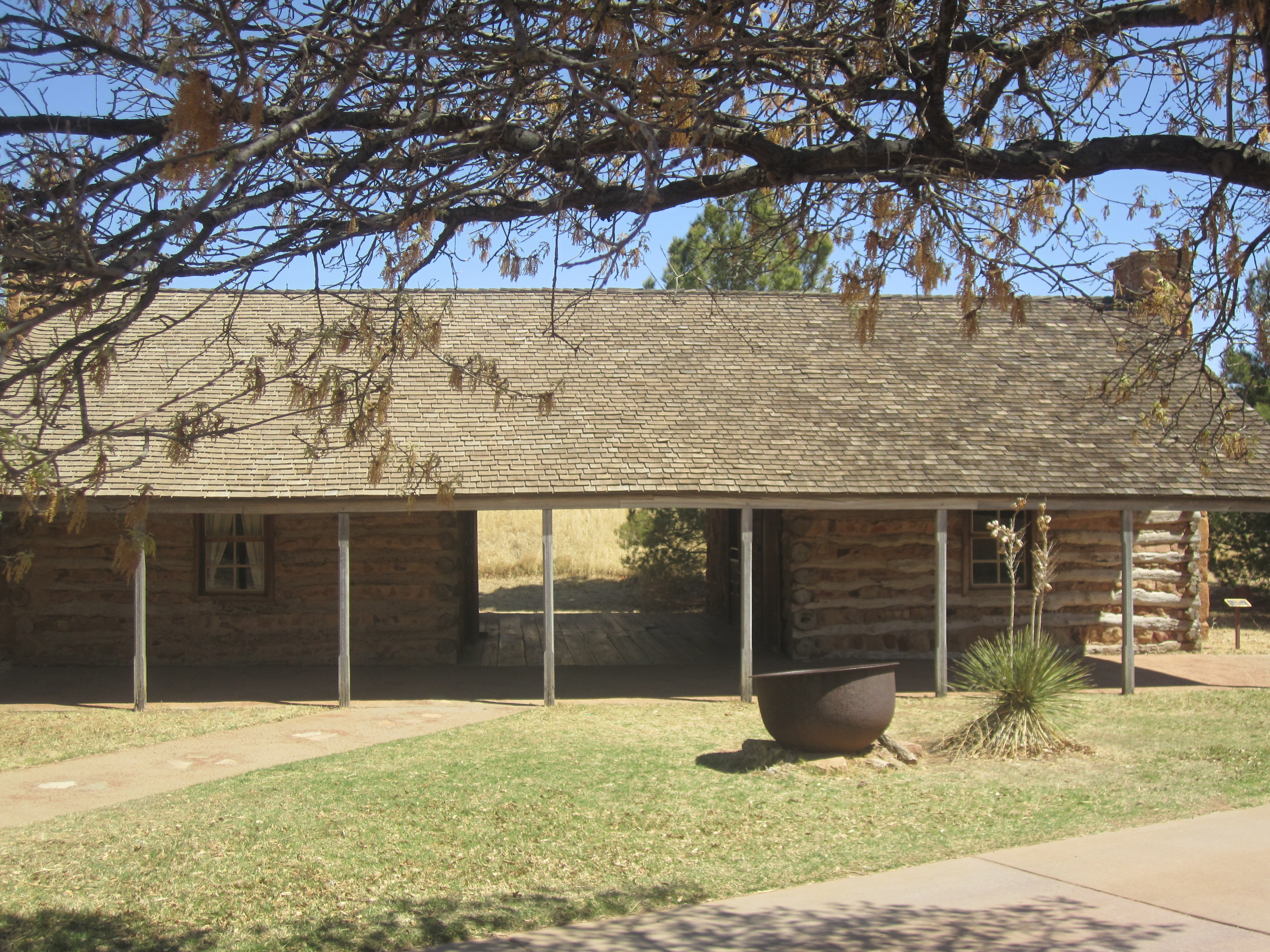
Hedwig's Hill Dogtrot House (1855) is essentially two log cabins under a common roof relocated from Mason County

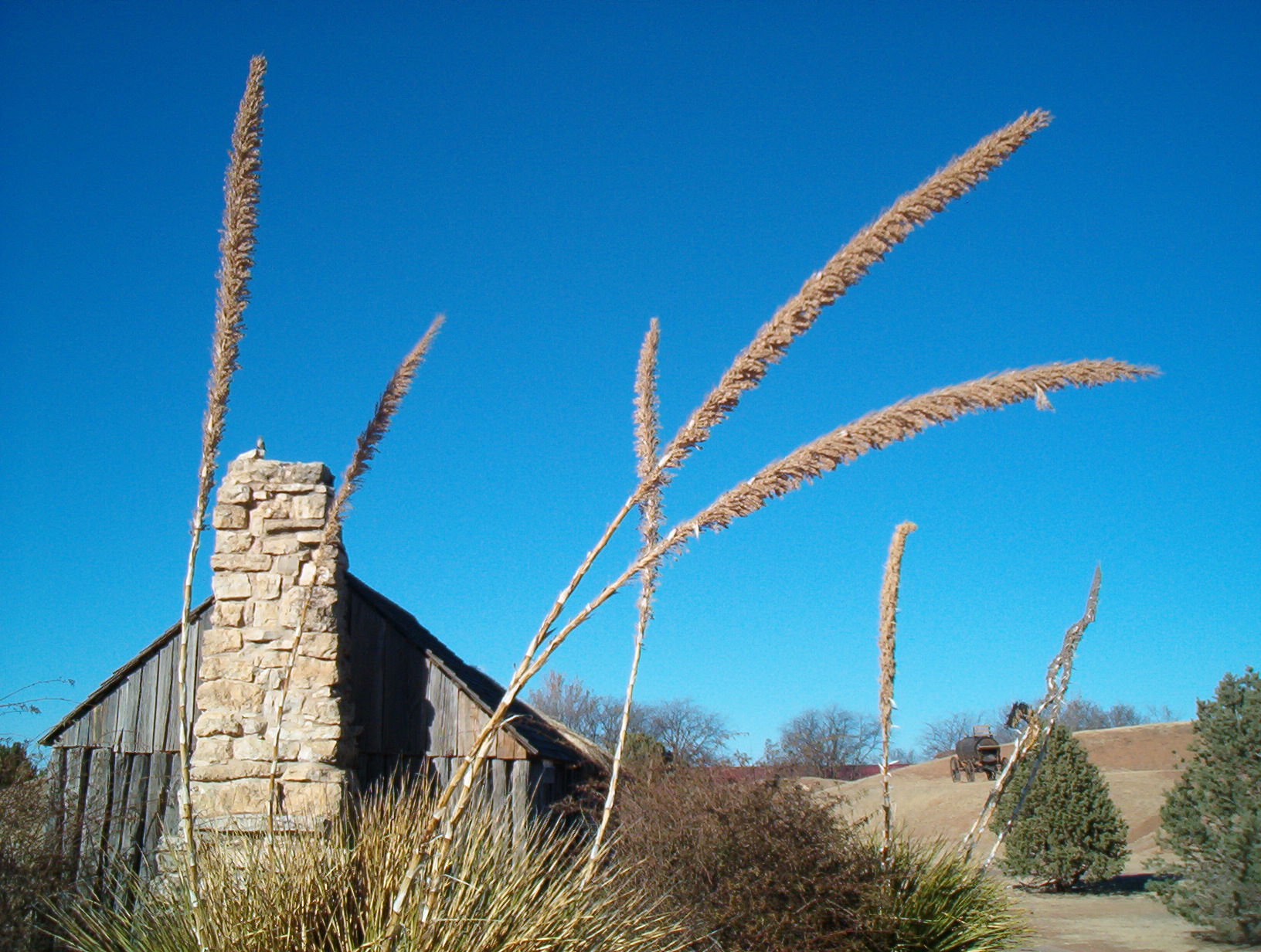
Restored Texan pioneer house

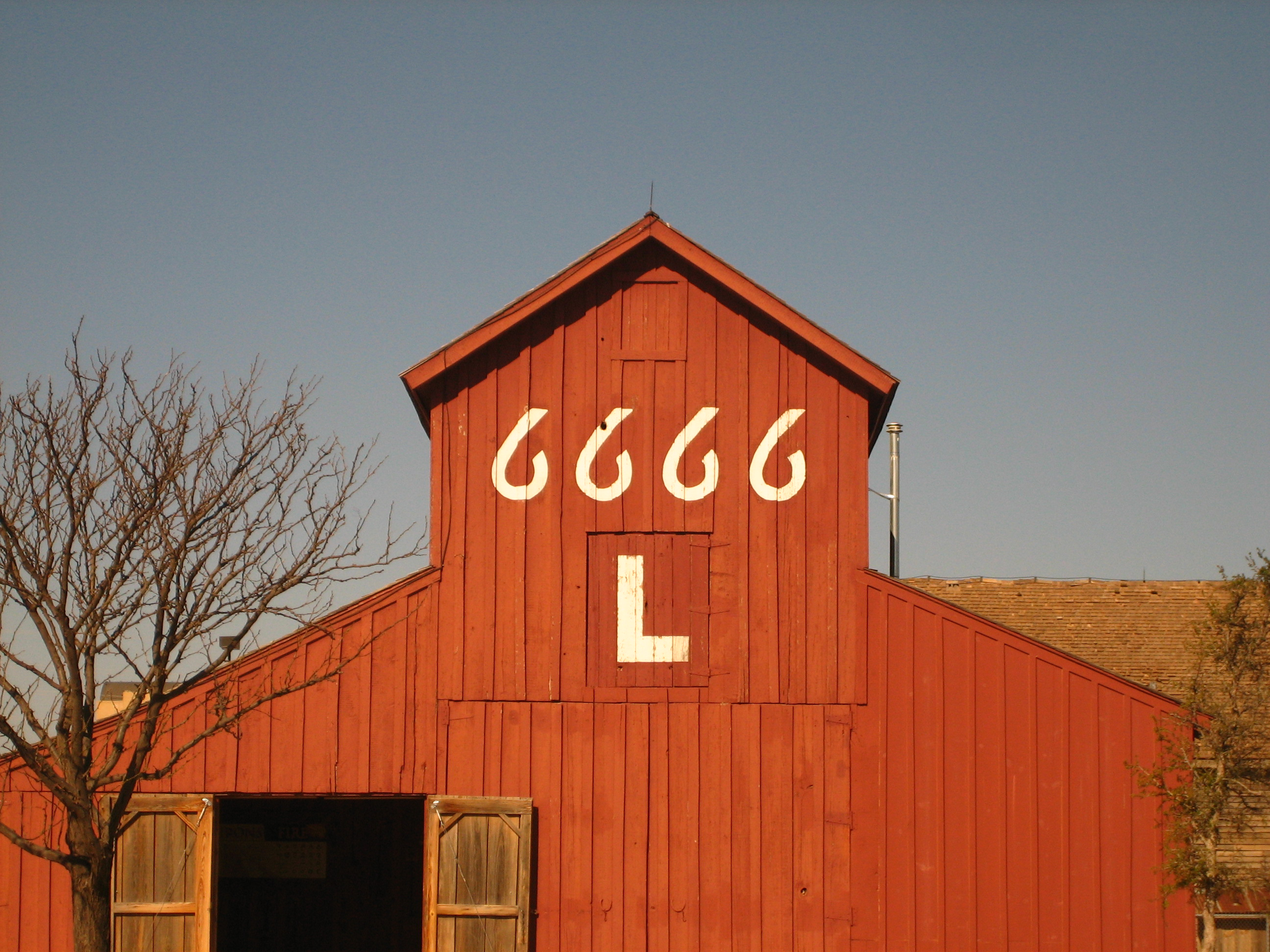
The 6666 barn stood near the home of rancher Samuel Burk Burnett in Guthrie until it was removed to the NRHC.

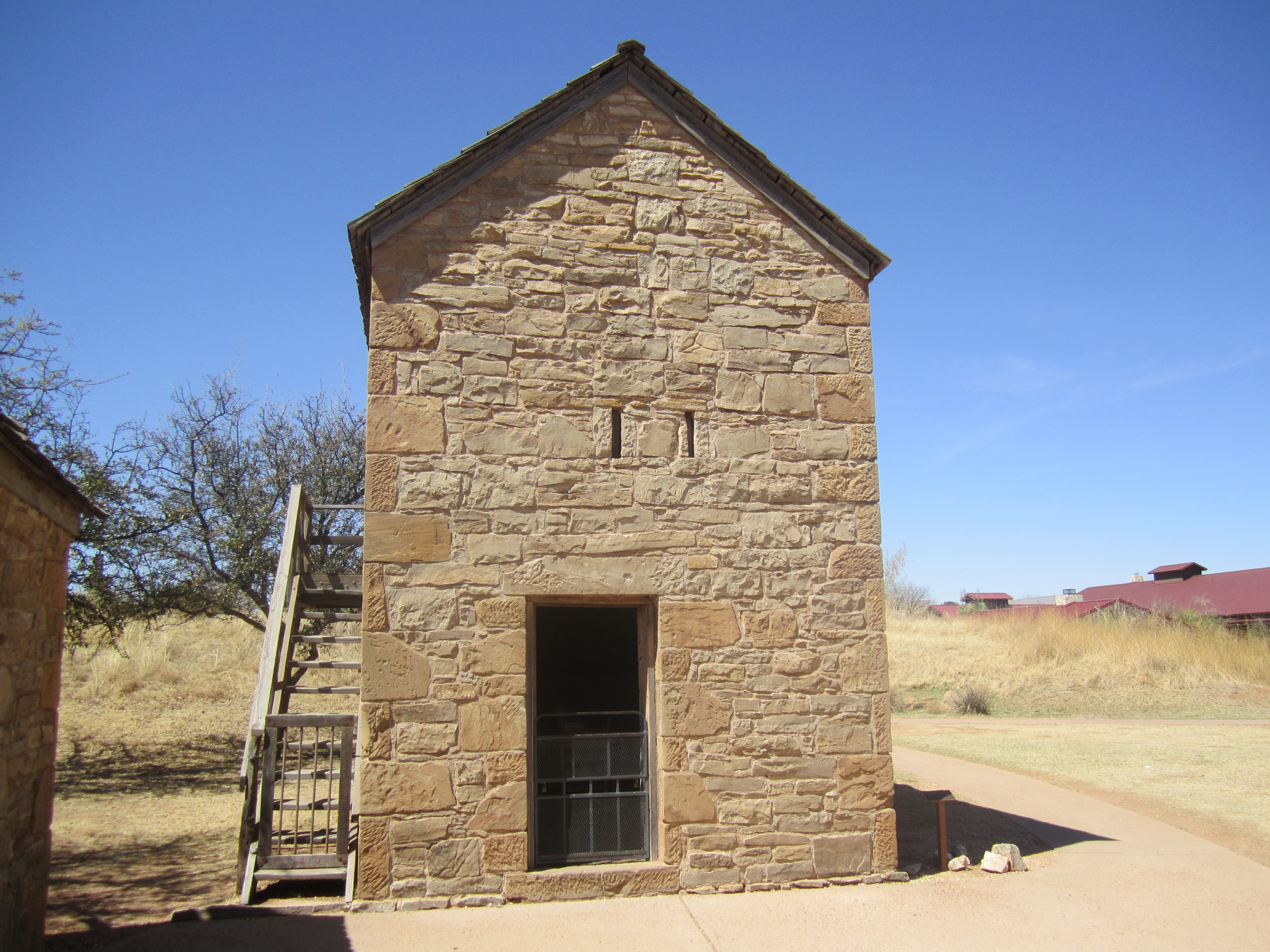
The Jowell House (1872-1873) from Palo Pinto County is a fortress style residence, with an outside ladder to the second floor.

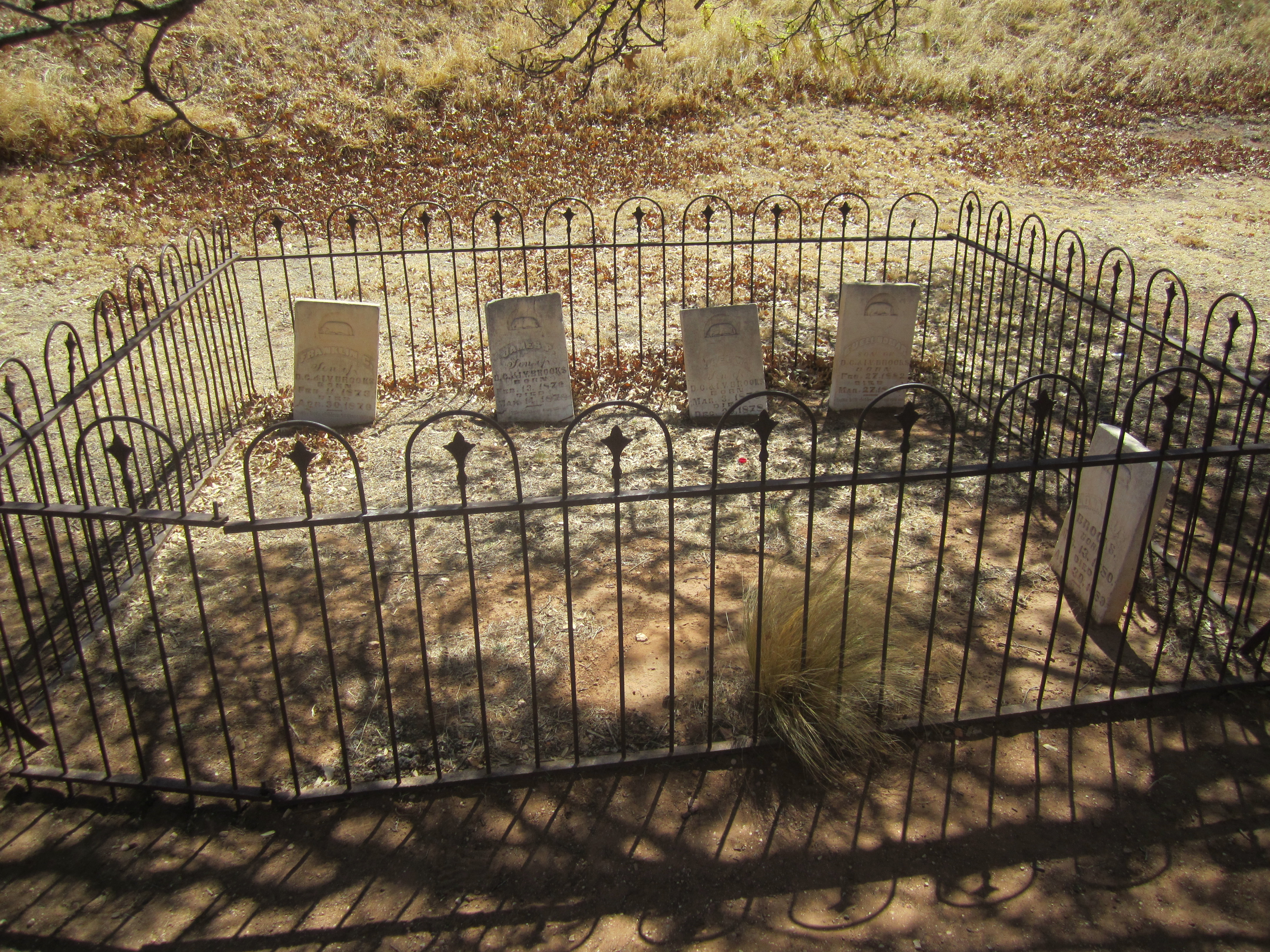
Because children frequently died young in the American West, the heritage center relocated this Jowell Cemetery (1876-1889) from Palo Pinto County.

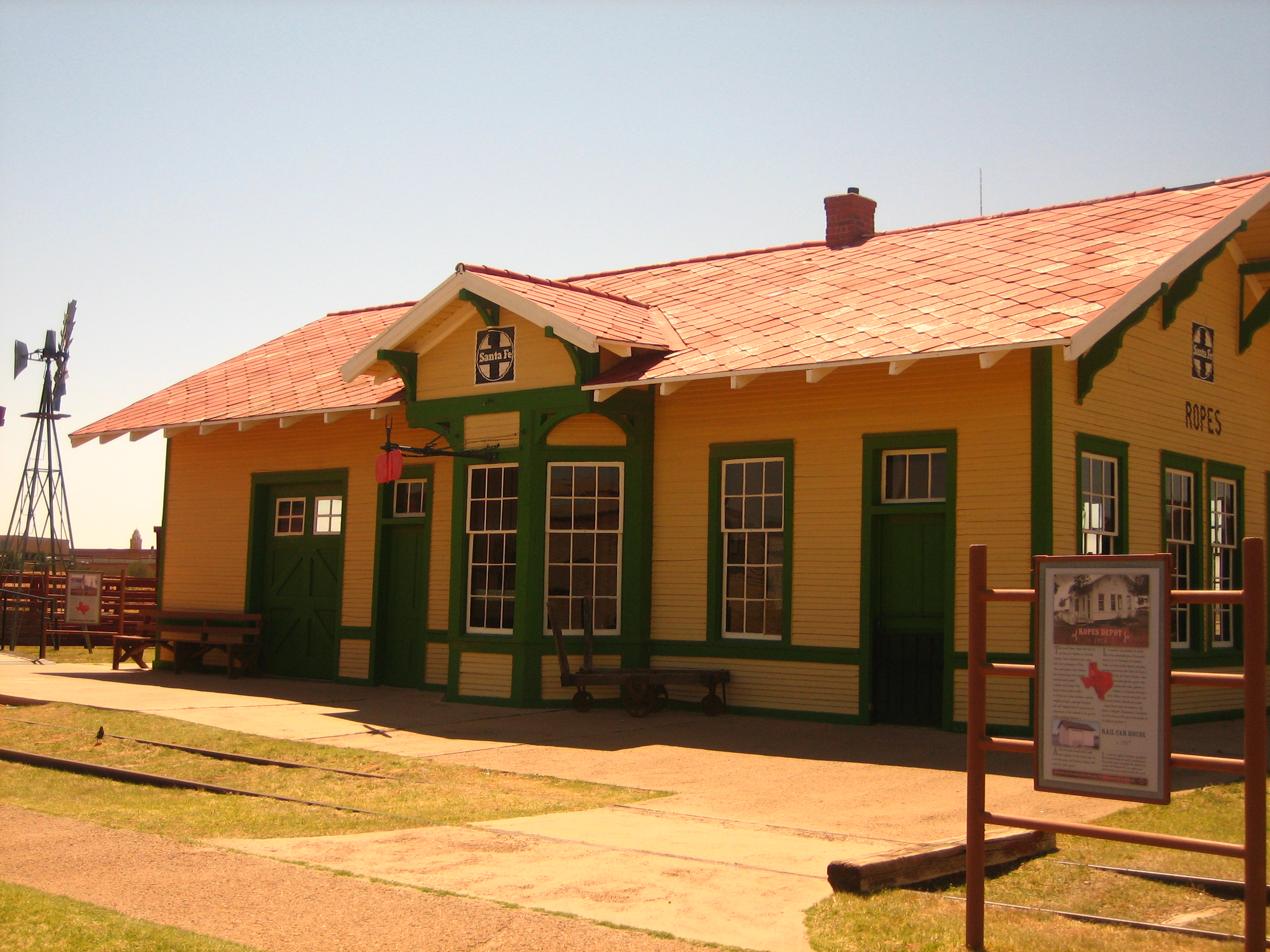
Atchison, Topeka and Santa Fe Railroad at the Ropes Depot

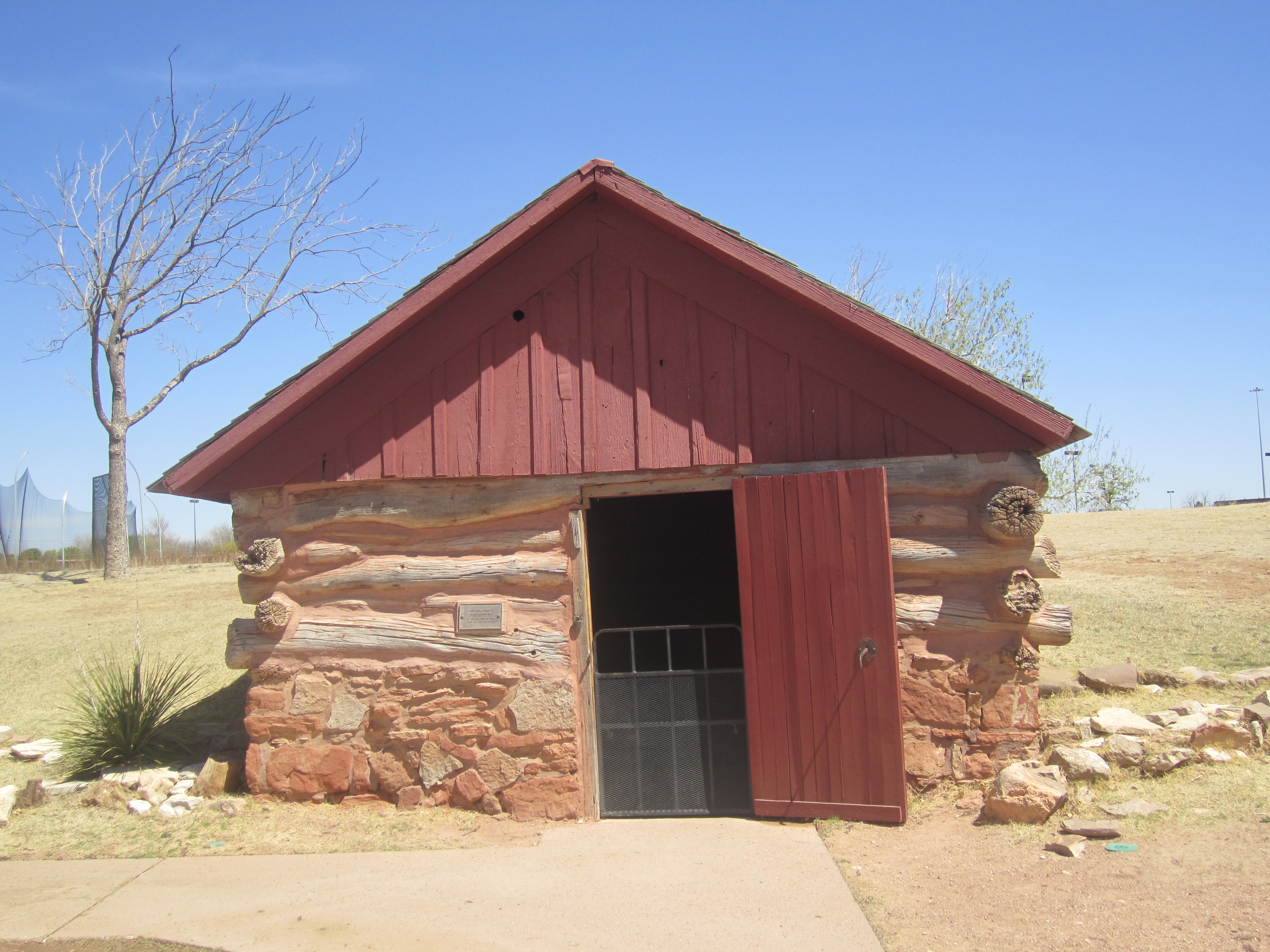
This half-dugout (1888) in Dickens County was removed from the Matador Ranch to the NRHC.

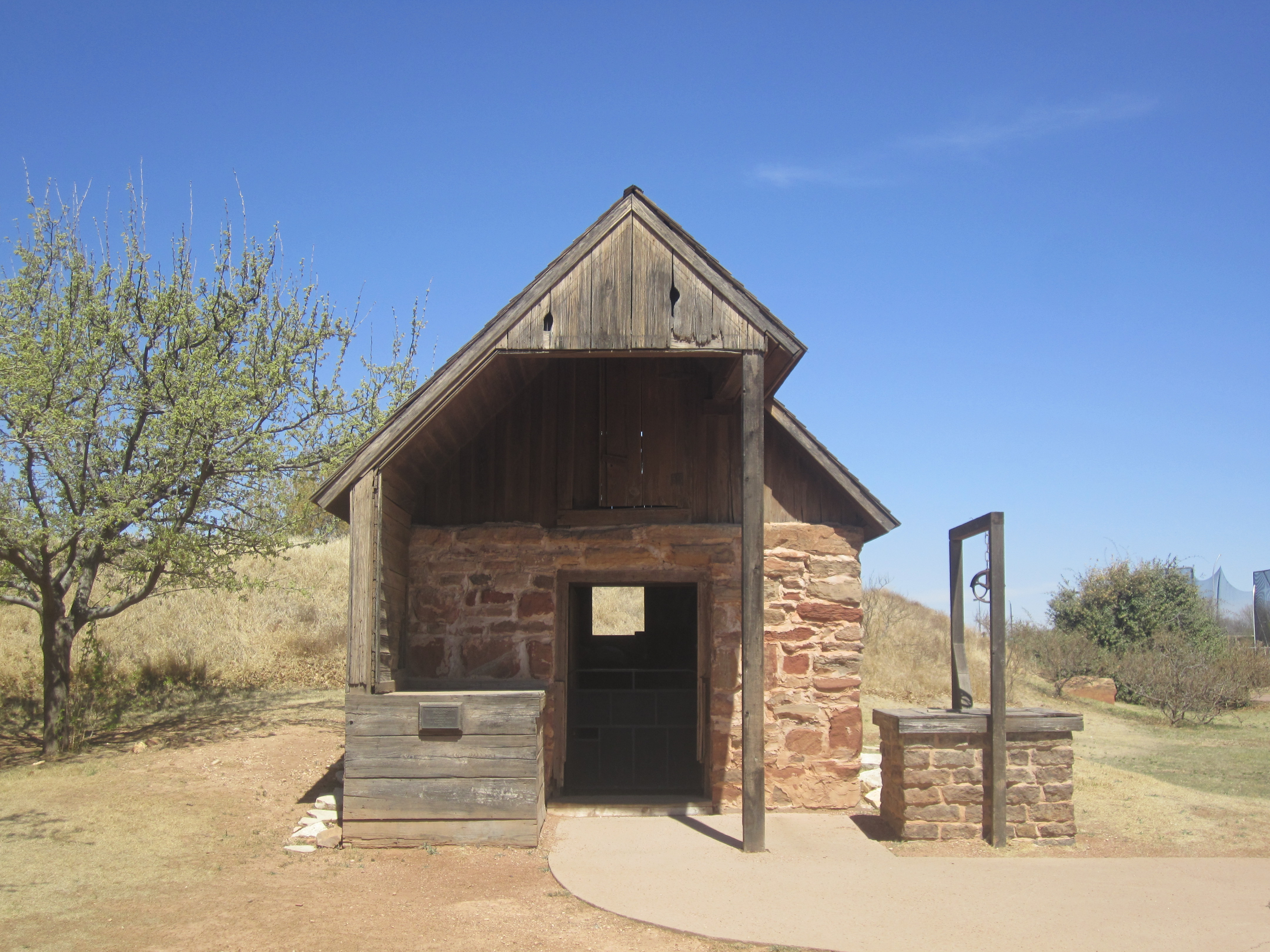
Waggoner Ranch commissary (1870s), relocated to the NRHC from Wichita County

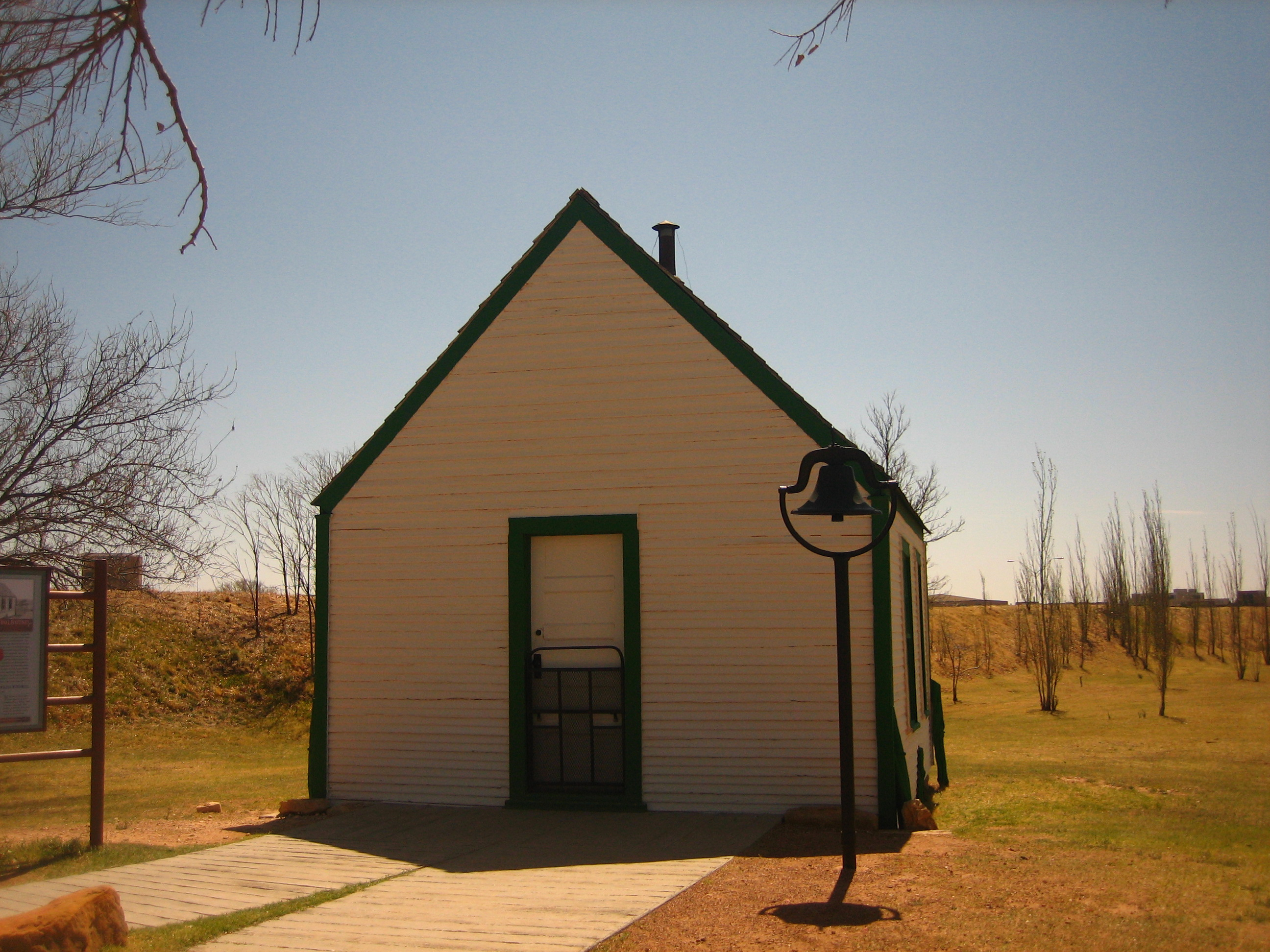
One-room Bairfield Schoolhouse used in Donley and Armstrong counties until 1937

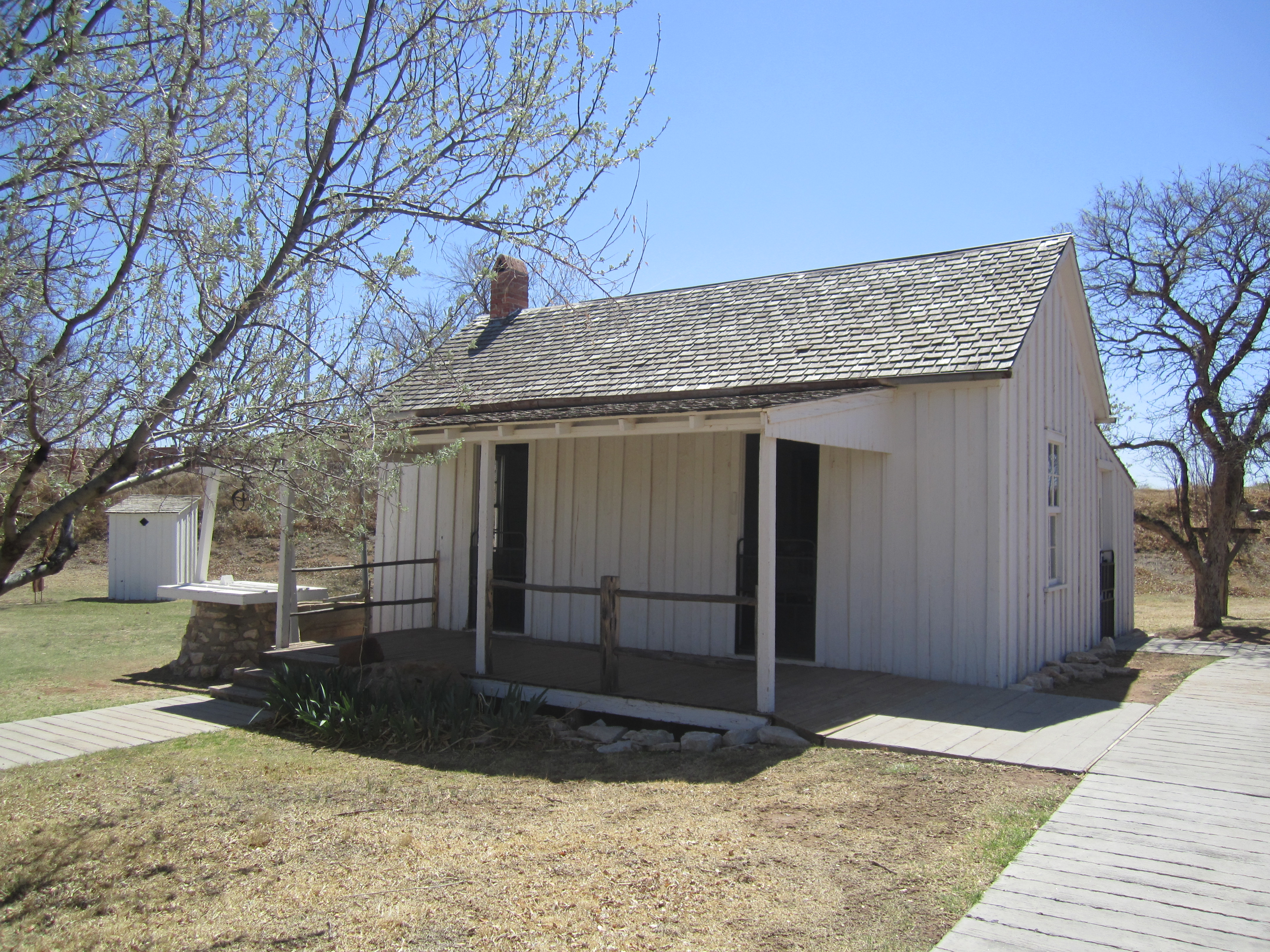
Box and strip house (1903, 1907), with dual entrances but uninsulated, was relocated to the NRHC from Martin County.

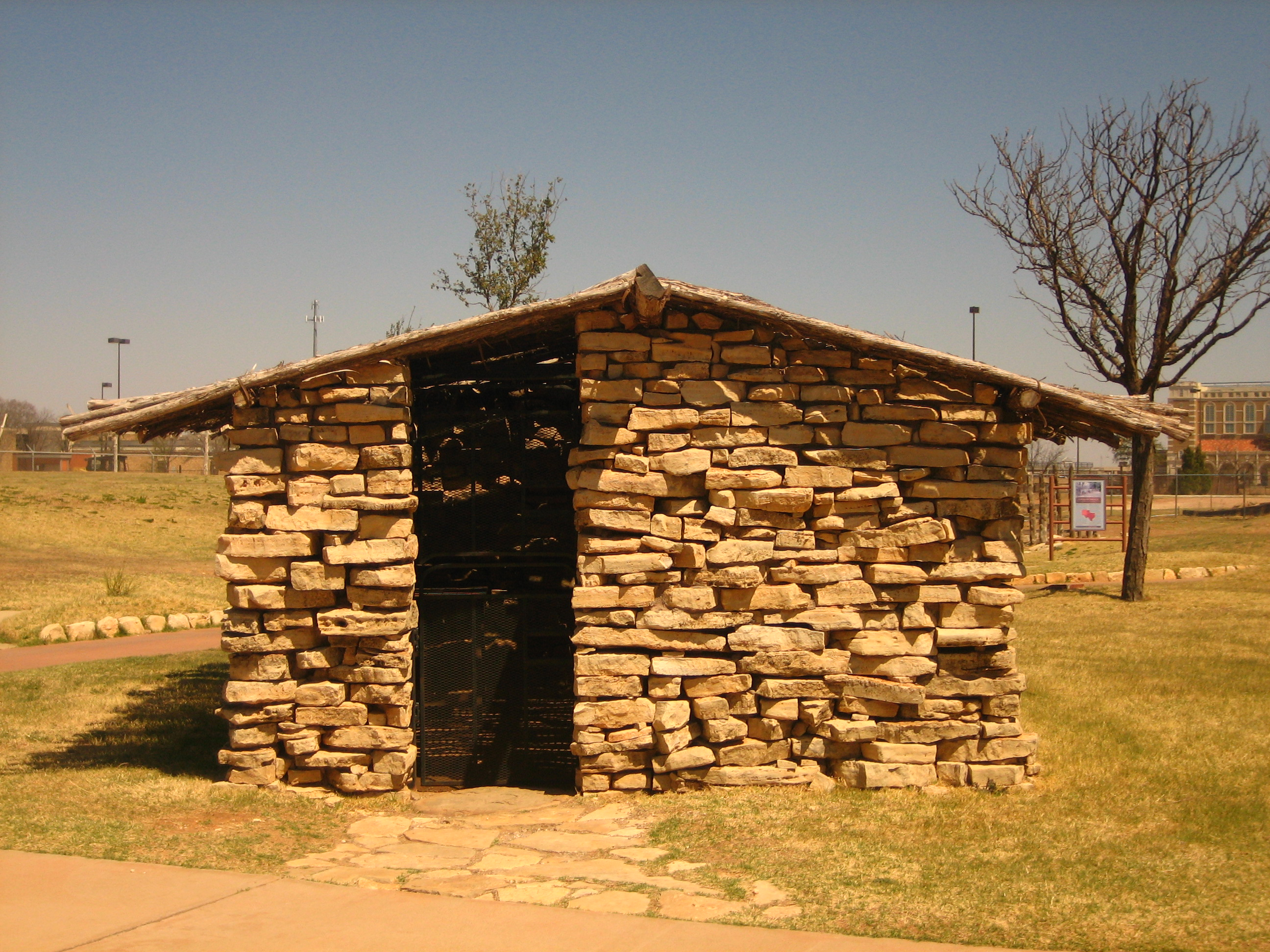
Pioneer mail station (1875) relocated from Knox County

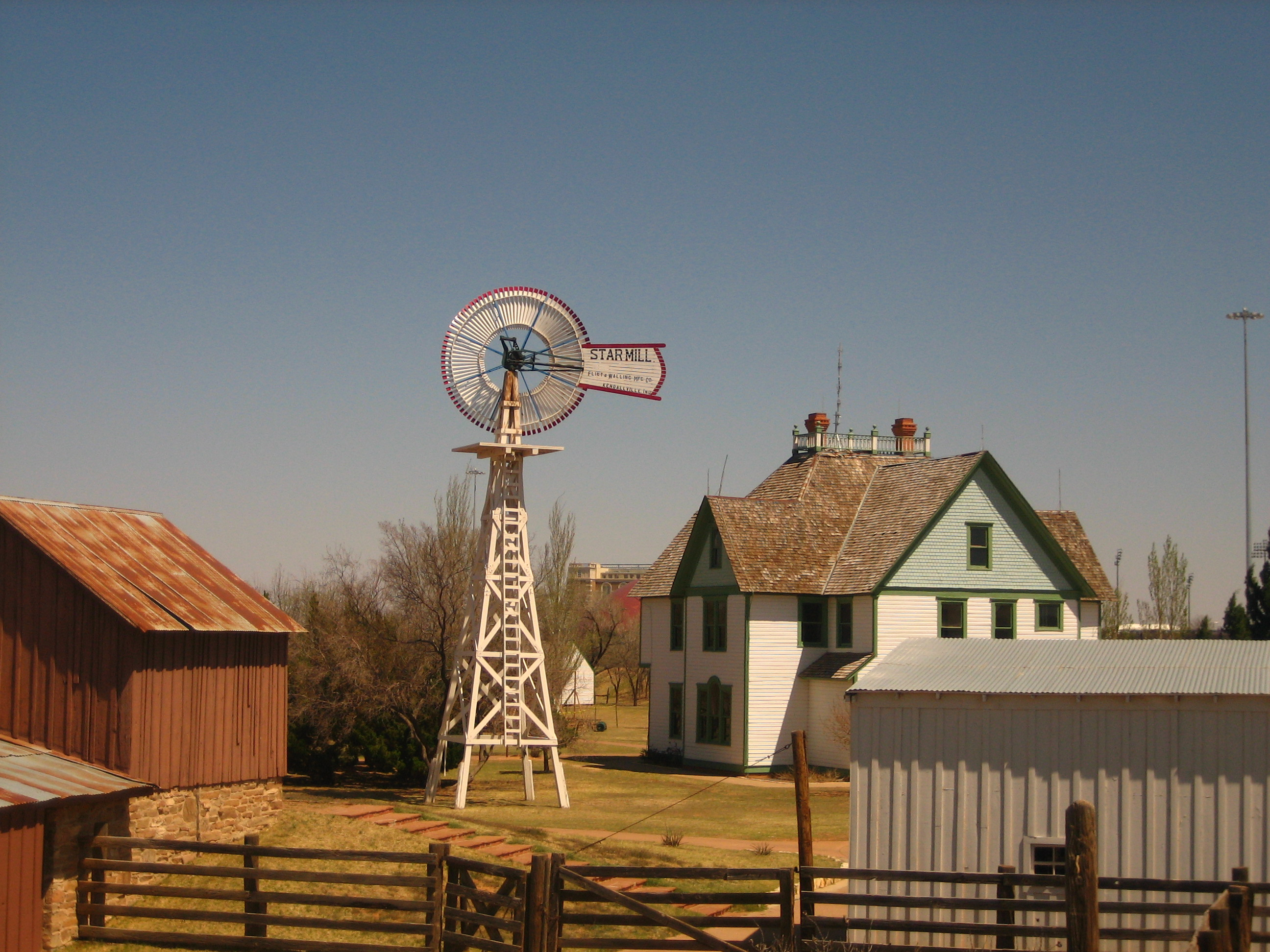
Starmill windmill at NRHC

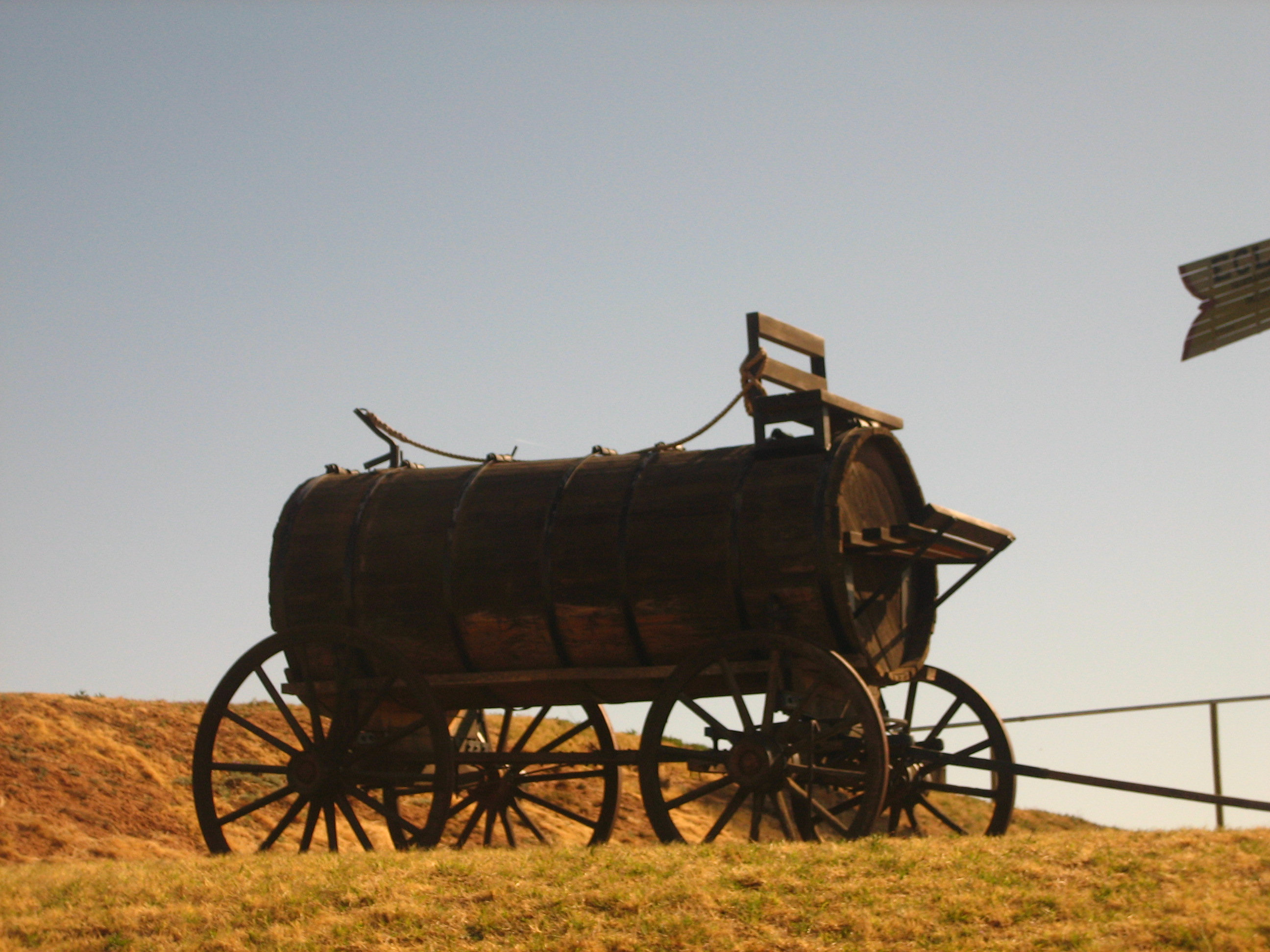
A cart for transporting water from a well powered by a windmill

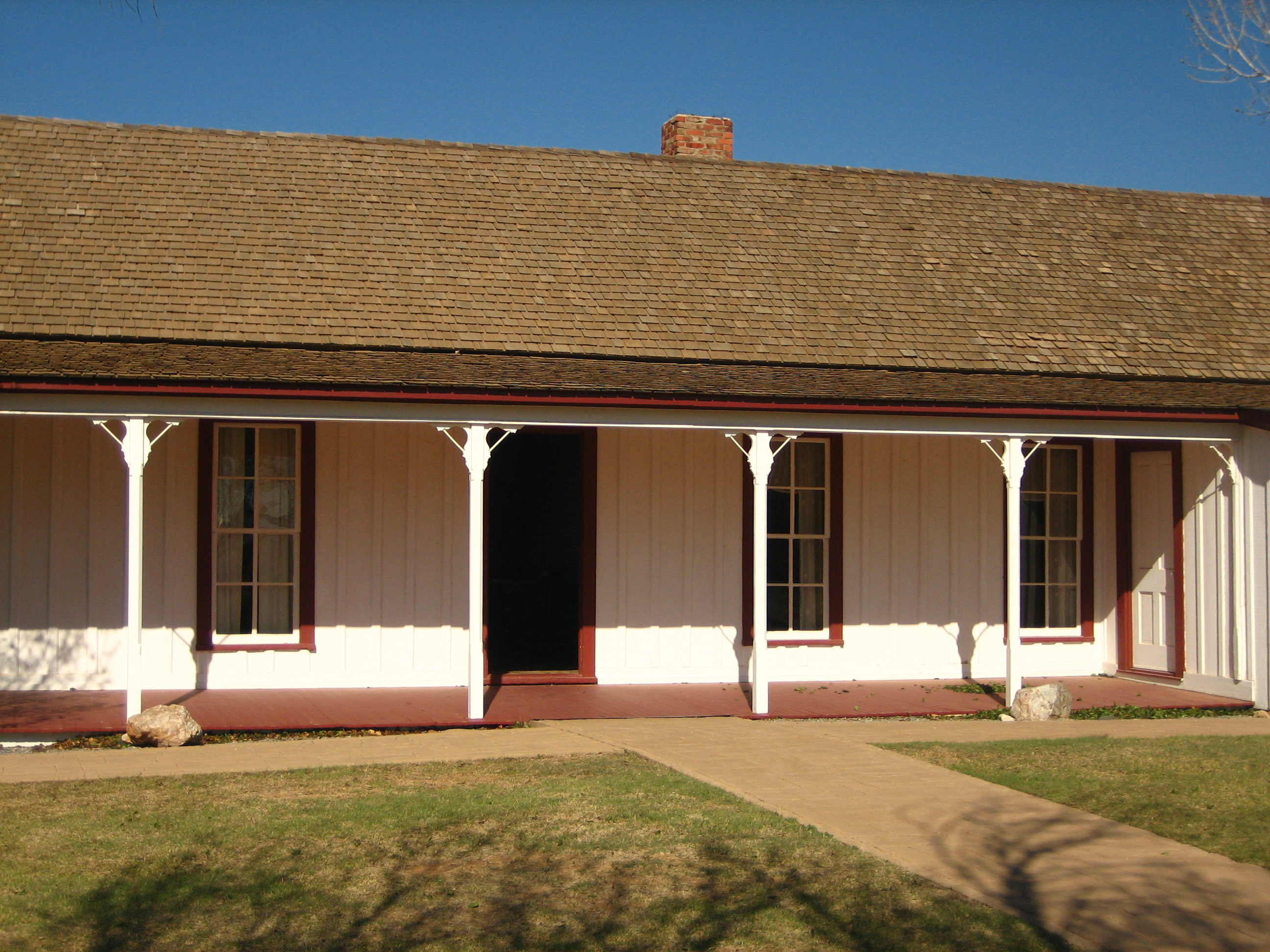
The Harrell House, named for sisters Fay and Myrtle Harrell of Scurry County, was built in phases between 1885 and 1917.

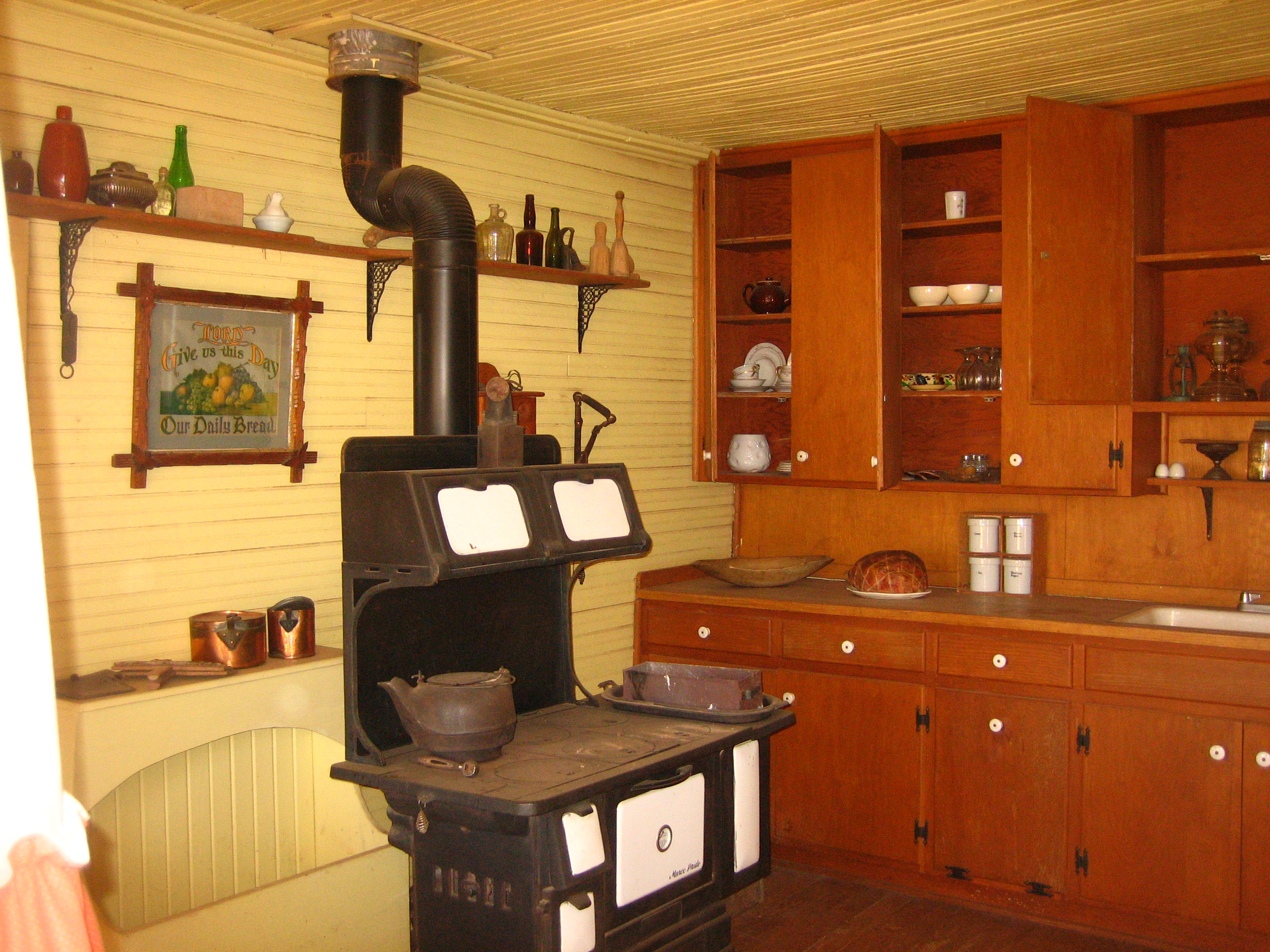
Pioneer kitchen in Harrell House

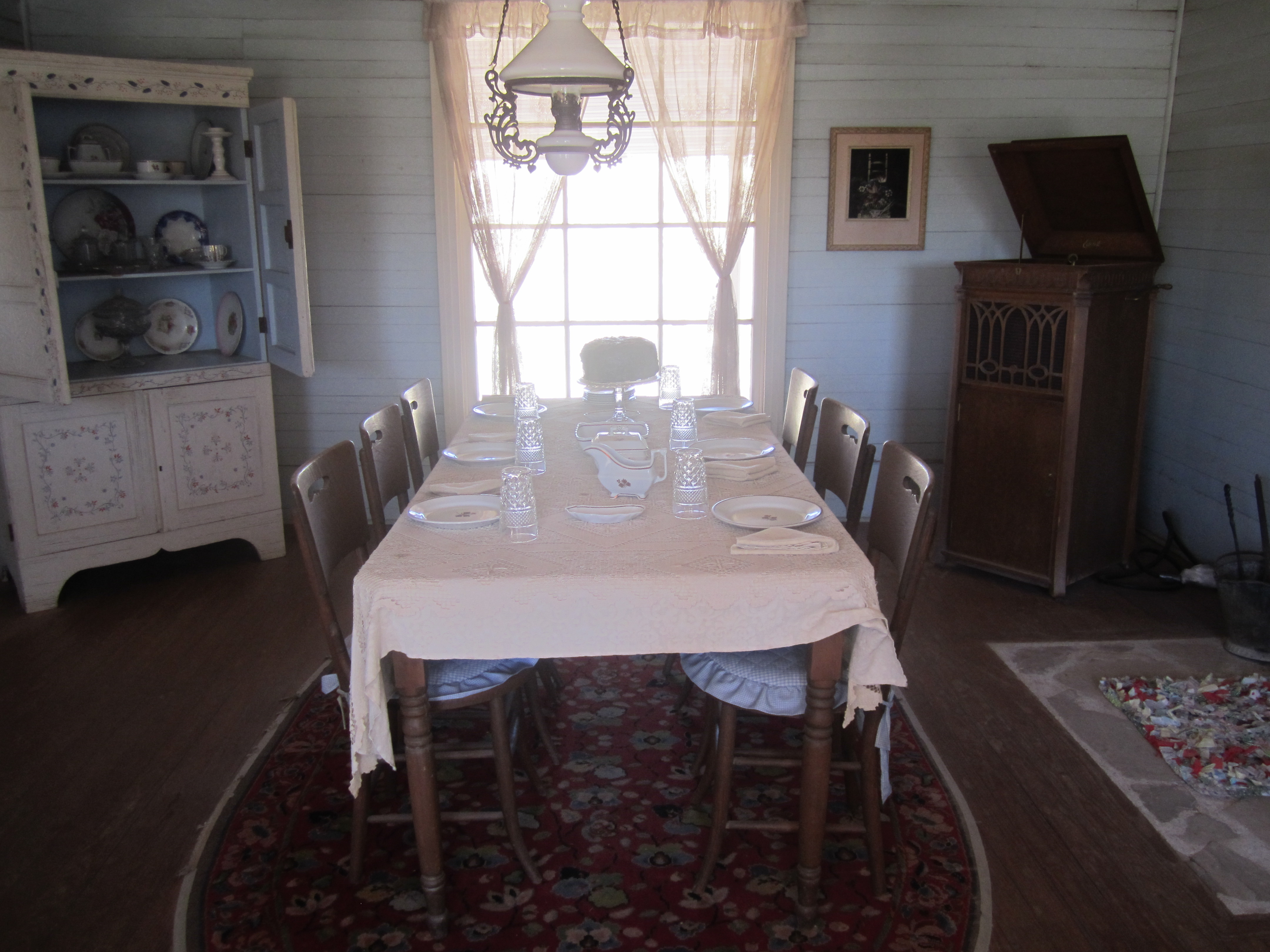
Dining room at Harrell House

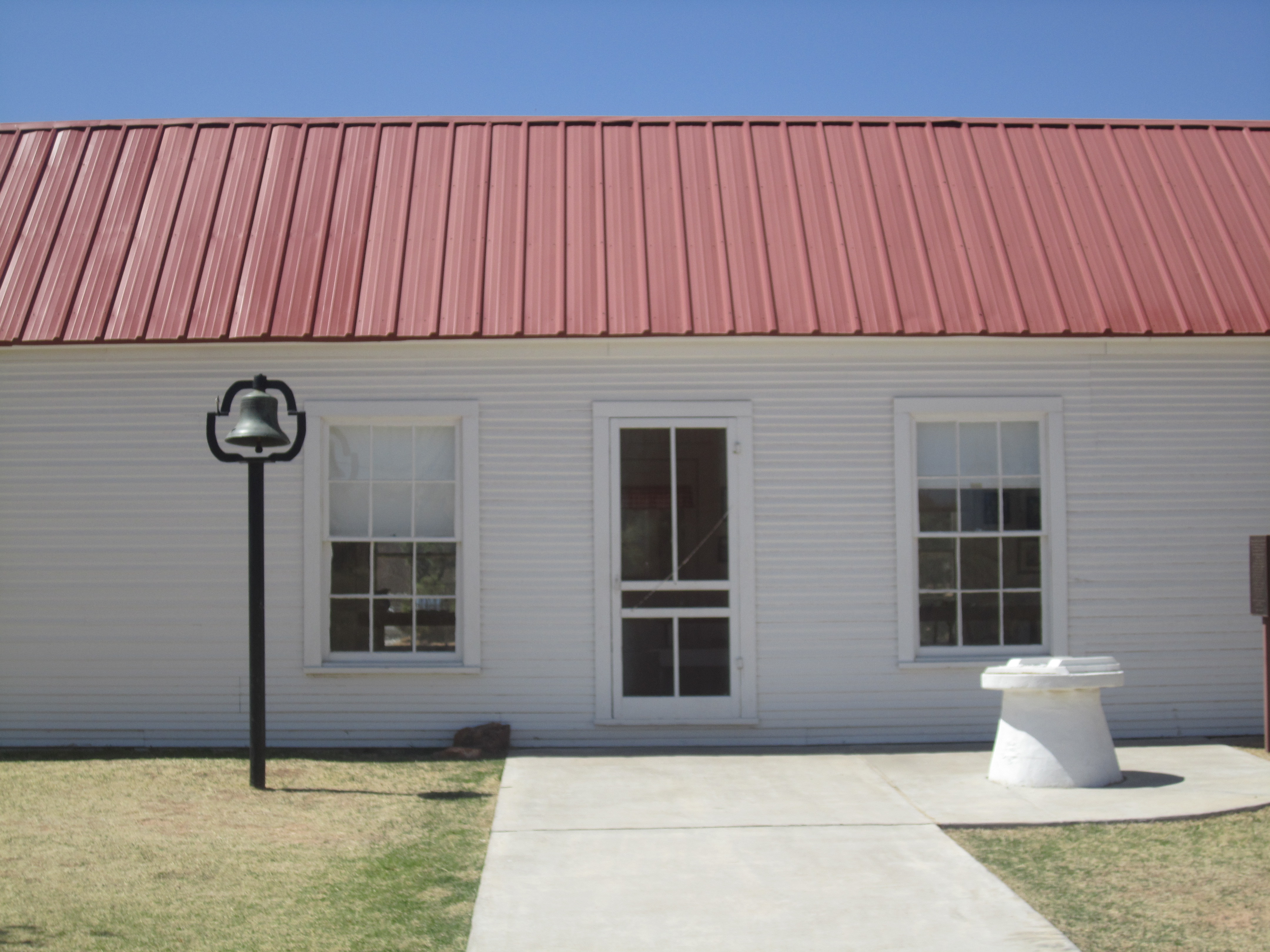
Restored Pitchfork Ranch cookhouse from Dickens County at NRHC

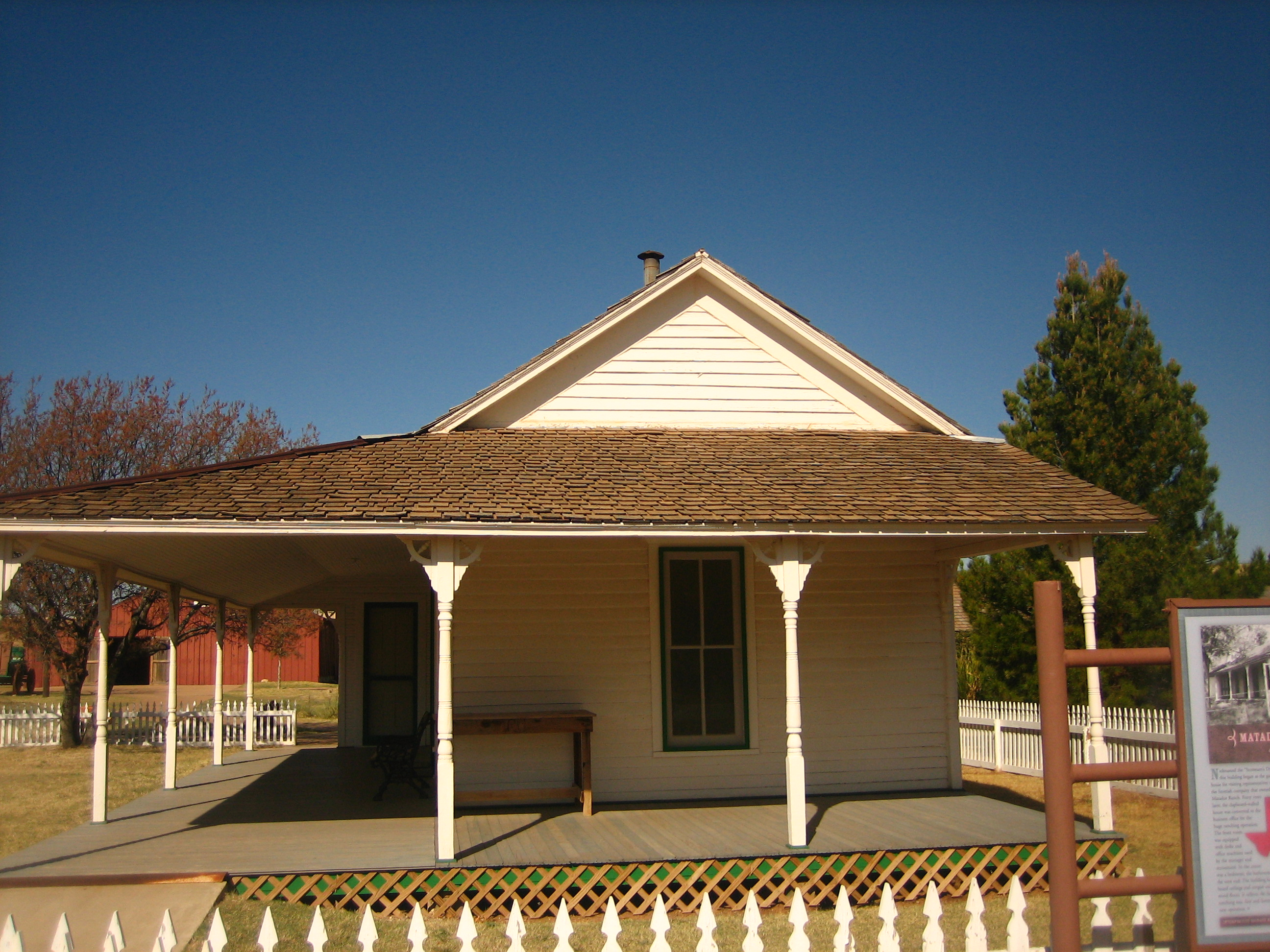
A ranch office building at the Heritage Center

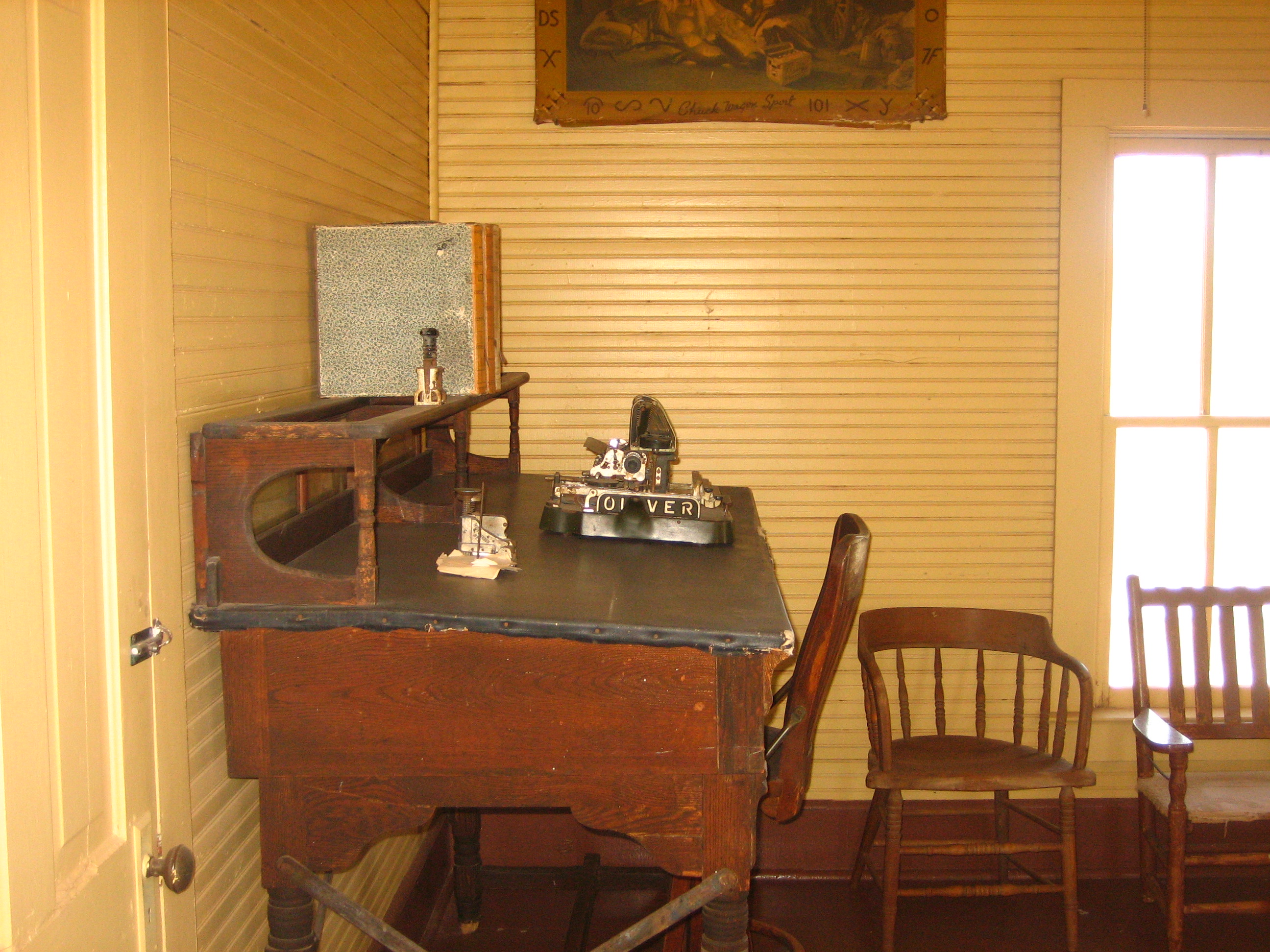
Inside of ranch office

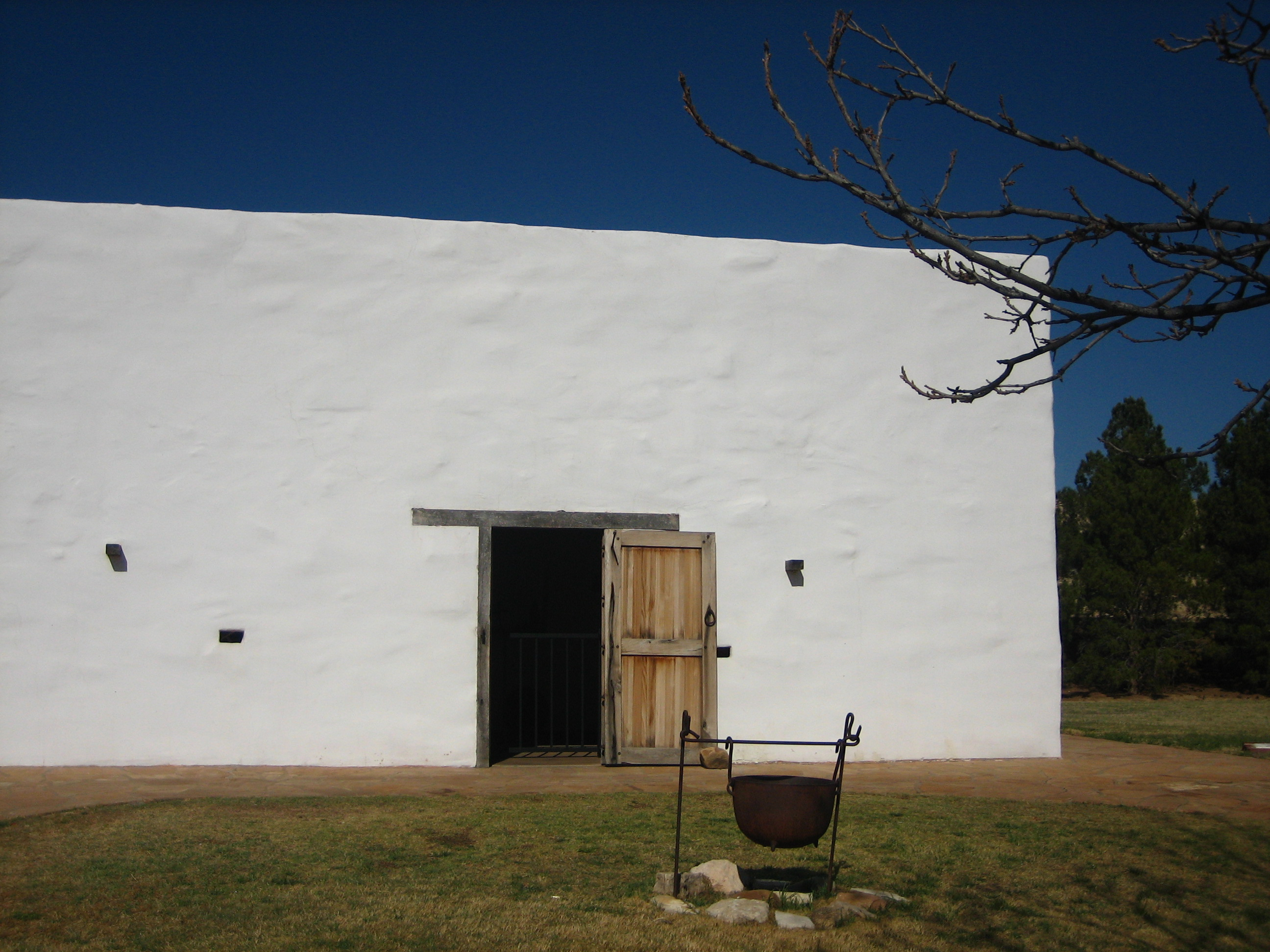
The Los Corralitos (meaning "Little Corrals") Building was relocated to the Heritage Center from Zapata County in South Texas

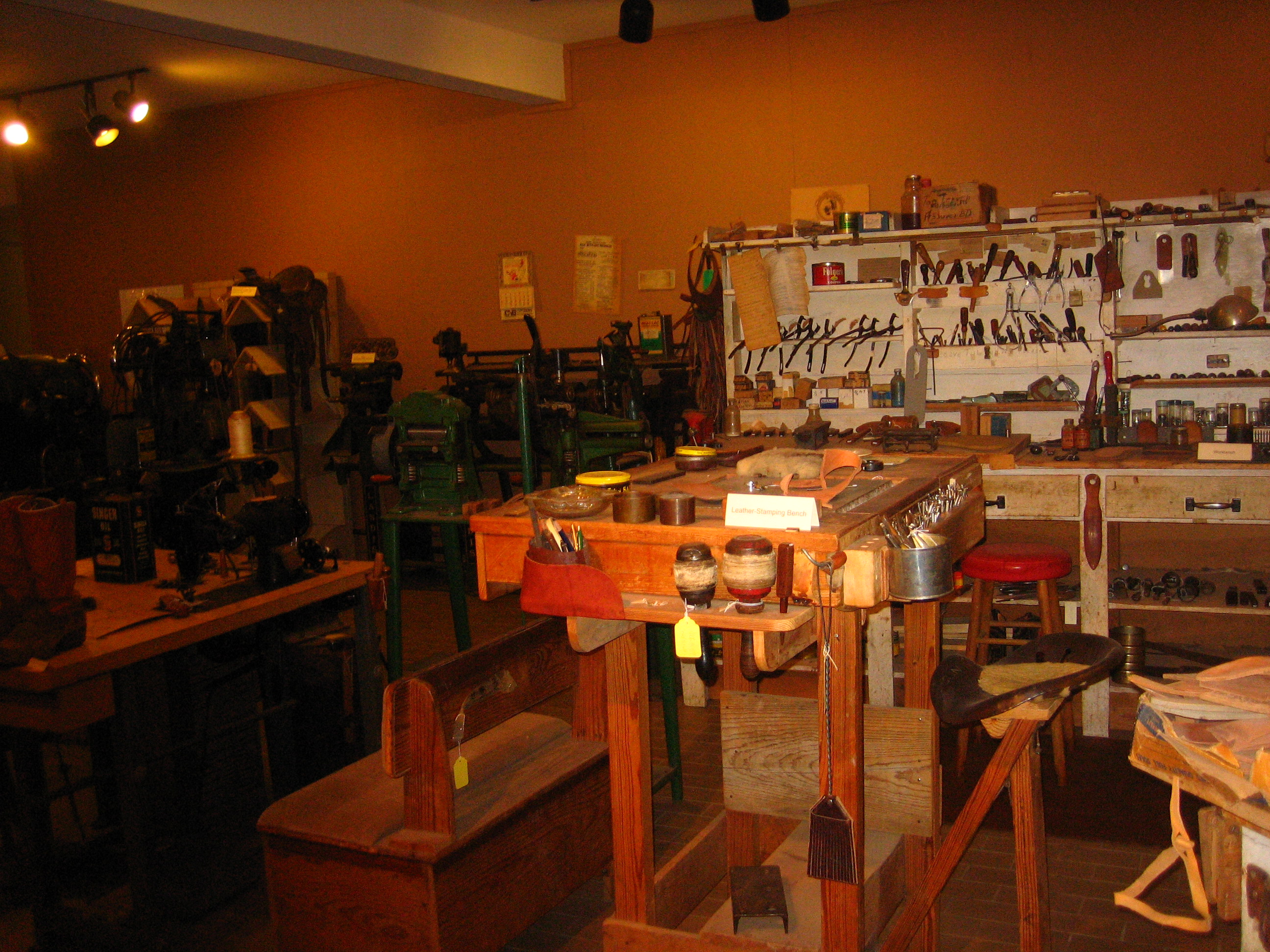
Replica of Charles Weldon "Tooter" Cannon (1915-1997) Saddle Shop at Heritage Center

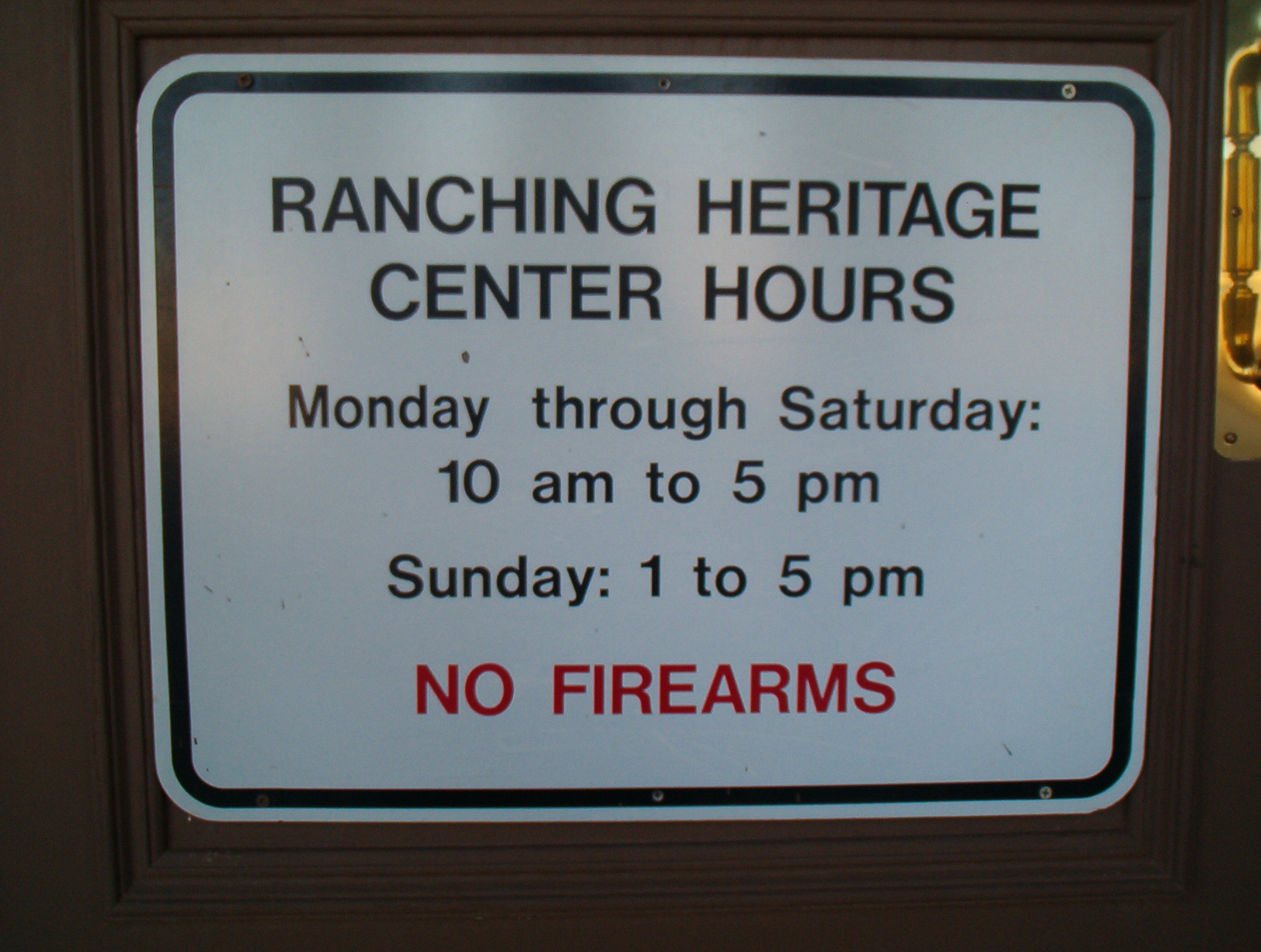
Ranching Center hours

== See also ==
- American Wind Power Center
