= Microcharis =

Scientific classification
- Kingdom: Plantae
- Clade: Tracheophytes
- Clade: Angiosperms
- Clade: Eudicots
- Clade: Rosids
- Order: Fabales
- Family: Fabaceae
- Subfamily: Faboideae
- Tribe: Indigofereae
- Genus: Microcharis; Benth. (1865)

Type species
- Microcharis tenella Benth.

Species
- 36; see text

Synonyms
- Indigofera subgenus Microcharis (Benth.) J.B. Gillett 1958; Indigofera subgenus Indigastrum sensu Cronquist 1954; Indigofera sensu Hutch. 1964

Genus of legumes

Microcharis is a genus of flowering plants. It includes 36 species of herbs and shrublets native to Africa and the Arabian Peninsula. The genus is in tribe Indigofereae of family Fabaceae. Typical habitats include seasonally-dry tropical forest margins, woodland, thicket, wooded grassland, and grassland, often in damp, swampy, or riverine areas, or in shallow soil over rocks.

== Species ==
Microcharis comprises the following species:

- Microcharis ammophila (Thulin) Schrire
- Microcharis angolensis Baker
- Microcharis annua (Milne-Redh.) Schrire
- Microcharis aphylla (R.Vig.) Schrire, Du Puy & Labat
- Microcharis asparagoides (Taub.) Schrire
- Microcharis brevistaminea (J.B.Gillett) Schrire
- Microcharis buchneri (Taub.) Schrire
- Microcharis butayei (De Wild.) Schrire
- Microcharis cana (Thulin) Schrire
- Microcharis contorta (J.B.Gillett) Schrire
- Microcharis cufodontii (Chiov.) Schrire
- Microcharis disjuncta (J.B.Gillett) Schrire
  - var. disjuncta (J.B.Gillett) Schrire
  - var. fallax (J.B. Gillett) Schrire
- Microcharis ephemera (J.B.Gillett) Schrire
- Microcharis galpinii N.E.Br.
- Microcharis garissaensis (J.B.Gillett) Schrire
- Microcharis gyrata (Thulin) Schrire
- Microcharis karinensis (Thulin) Schrire
- Microcharis kucharii (Thulin) Schrire
- Microcharis latifolia Benth.
- Microcharis longicalyx (J.B.Gillett) Schrire
- Microcharis medicaginea (Baker) Schrire
- Microcharis microcharoides (Taub.) Schrire
  - var. latistipulata (J.B. Gillett) Schrire
  - var. microcharoides (Taub.) Schrire
- Microcharis nematophylla Thulin
- Microcharis omissa Thulin
- Microcharis phyllogramme (R.Vig.) Schrire
- Microcharis praetermissa (Baker f.) Schrire
- Microcharis remotiflora (Baker f.) Schrire
- Microcharis sessilis (Thulin) Schrire
- Microcharis spathulata (J.B.Gillett) Schrire
- Microcharis stipulosa (Chiov.) Schrire
- Microcharis tenella Benth.
- Microcharis tenuirostris (Thulin) Schrire
- Microcharis tisserantii (Pellegr.) Schrire
- Microcharis tritoides (Baker) Schrire
  - subsp. obbiadensis (Chiov.) Schrire
  - subsp. tritoides (Baker) Schrire
- Microcharis wajirensis (J.B.Gillett) Schrire
- Microcharis welwitschii (Baker) Schrire
