= Phylloxylon spinosa =

Conservation status
- Vulnerable (IUCN 3.1)

Scientific classification
- Kingdom: Plantae
- Clade: Tracheophytes
- Clade: Angiosperms
- Clade: Eudicots
- Clade: Rosids
- Order: Fabales
- Family: Fabaceae
- Subfamily: Faboideae
- Genus: Phylloxylon
- Species: P. spinosa

Binomial name
- Phylloxylon spinosa Du Puy, Labat & Schrire

Species of legume

Phylloxylon spinosa is a species of legume in the family Fabaceae. It is found only in the northern tip of Madagascar. The tree is commonly harvested from the wild for local use of its hard and very durable wood. Selective and intensive harvesting for its favored construction properties means it is expected to decline rapidly. The species is classified as 'Endangered' in the IUCN Red List of Threatened Species.
