= Phylloxylon xylophylloides =

Conservation status
- Near Threatened (IUCN 3.1)

Scientific classification
- Kingdom: Plantae
- Clade: Tracheophytes
- Clade: Angiosperms
- Clade: Eudicots
- Clade: Rosids
- Order: Fabales
- Family: Fabaceae
- Subfamily: Faboideae
- Genus: Phylloxylon
- Species: P. xylophylloides

Binomial name
- Phylloxylon xylophylloides (Baker) Du Puy, Labat & Schrire

Synonyms
- Neobaronia phyllanthoides Baker; Neobaronia xylophylloides (Baker) Taub. Phylloxylon cloiselii Drake; Phylloxylon ensifolium Baill. Exocarpos xylophylloides Baker

Species of plant

Phylloxylon xylophylloides is a species of legume in the family Fabaceae. It is found only in Madagascar.
