= Phylloxylon decipiens =

Conservation status
- Endangered (IUCN 3.1)

Scientific classification
- Kingdom: Plantae
- Clade: Tracheophytes
- Clade: Angiosperms
- Clade: Eudicots
- Clade: Rosids
- Order: Fabales
- Family: Fabaceae
- Subfamily: Faboideae
- Genus: Phylloxylon
- Species: P. decipiens

Binomial name
- Phylloxylon decipiens Baill.

Species of legume

Phylloxylon decipiens is a species of legume in the family of Fabaceae. It is found only in Madagascar.
