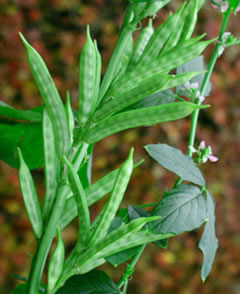
- Guar bean cluster

Scientific classification
- Kingdom: Plantae
- Clade: Embryophytes
- Clade: Tracheophytes
- Clade: Angiosperms
- Clade: Eudicots
- Clade: Rosids
- Order: Fabales
- Family: Fabaceae
- Subfamily: Faboideae
- Genus: Cyamopsis
- Species: C. tetragonoloba

Binomial name
- Cyamopsis tetragonoloba (L.) Taub.

Synonyms
- Cyamopsis psoralioides auct., orth. var.; Cyamopsis psoraloides DC.; Cyamopsis psoraloides (Lam.) DC.

= Guar =

Species of flowering plant in the bean family Fabaceae

The guar (from Hindi: ग्वार: gvār) or cluster bean, with the botanical name Cyamopsis tetragonoloba, is an annual legume and the source of guar gum. It is also known as gavar, gawar, or guvar bean. The genus name Cyamopsis means bean-like (from Greek: κύαμος, romanized: kýamos: "bean" + Greek: ὄψις, romanized: ópsis: "view"). The specific name is from Greek: τετράγωνον, romanized: tetrágōnon and Latin: lobus (itself being a loanword of Ancient Greek λοβός) meaning four-squared-lobed.

The origin of Cyamopsis tetragonoloba is unknown, since it has never been found in the wild. It is assumed to have developed from the African species Cyamopsis senegalensis. It was further domesticated in South Asia, where it has been cultivated for centuries. Guar is drought-tolerant and grows well in semiarid areas.

This legume is a valuable plant in a crop rotation cycle, as it lives in symbiosis with nitrogen-fixing bacteria. Agriculturists in semi-arid regions of Rajasthan follow crop-rotation and use guar to replenish the soil with essential fertilizers and nitrogen fixation, before the next crop. Guar has many functions for human and animal nutrition, but the gelling agent in its seeds (guar gum) is the most important use. Demand is rising due to the use of guar gum in hydraulic fracturing (fracking) of oil shale gas. It is also a major ingredient of the toy Slime. About 80% of world production occurs in India, but due to strong demand, the plant is being introduced elsewhere.

== Biology ==
Cyamopsis tetragonoloba grows upright, reaching a maximum height of up to 2–3 metres (7–10 ft). It has a main single stem with either basal branching or fine branching along the stem. Guar taproots can access soil moisture in low soil depths. This legume develops root nodules with nitrogen-fixing soil bacteria rhizobia in the surface part of its rooting system. Its leaves and stems are mostly hairy, depending on the cultivar. Its fine leaves have an elongated oval shape (5 to 10 centimetres (2 to 4 in)) and of alternate position. Clusters of flowers grow in the plant axil and are white to blueish in color. The developing pods are rather flat and slim containing 5 to 12 small oval seeds of 5 millimetres (1/4 in) length (TGW = 25–40 grams (1–1 1/2 oz)). Usually mature seeds are white or gray, but with excess moisture they can turn black and lose germination capacity. The chromosome number of guar seeds is 2n=14. The seeds of guar beans have a remarkable characteristic. Its kernel consists of a protein-rich germ (43–46%) and a relatively large endosperm (34–40%), containing large amounts of the galactomannan. This is a polysaccharide containing polymers of mannose and galactose in a ratio of 2:1 with many branches. Thus, it exhibits a great hydrogen bonding activity having a viscosifying effect in liquids.

== Cultivation ==
=== Climate requirements ===
Guar is drought-tolerant and sun-loving, but it is susceptible to frost. Although it can cope with low but regular rainfall, it requires sufficient soil moisture before planting and during maturation of seeds. Frequent drought periods can lead to delayed maturation. On the contrary, excessive moisture during the early growth phase and after maturation leads to lower seed quality. Guar is produced near to coastal areas in the Gandhidham region of Kutch, Gujarat, India.

=== Soil requirements ===
Cyamopsis tetragonoloba (L.) can grow on a wide range of soil types. Preferably in fertile, medium-textured and sandy loam soils that are well-drained, since waterlogging decreases plant performance. Guar grows best in moderate alkaline conditions (pH 7–8) and is tolerant of salinity. Its taproots are inoculated with rhizobia nodules and thus it produces nitrogen-rich biomass and improves soil quality.

=== Cultural practices ===
Seeding	Seedbed: firm, weed-free; Date: soil temperature > 21 °C (optimum: 30 °C); monsoon-regions: after first rain event in June or early July; Rate: seed use: 10–30 kg/ha, biomass use: 50–100 kg/ha; Row spacing: seed use: 45–60 cm, biomass use: 30–45 cm
Fertilizer	Nitrogen: not necessary; Phosphorus: often limiting, US: Superphosphate 200–250 kg/ha
Plant Protection	Weeding: young guar plant development is susceptible to weeds. Early, well prepared seedbeds help reduce weed harm; Diseases: choose disease-resistant cultivars, 2 major diseases: Alternaria cucumerina var. cyamopsidis and Xanthomonoas cyamopsidis; Predators: Contarinia texana guar midge: rainfall or sprinkler irrigation reduce midge populations
Harvest	seed pods: dry, brown, 60–90 days after sowing; biomass: first lower pods turn brown
Yield	seeds: 5–8 dt/ha; biomass: 40–50 t/ha
Footnotes:

=== Cultivation areas ===
Guar is grown principally in north-western India with smaller crops grown in the semiarid areas of the high plains of Texas in the US, Australia and Africa. The most important growing area centers on Jodhpur in Rajasthan, India, where demand for guar for fractionation produced an agricultural boom as in 2012. Currently [When? As of 2023?], India is the main producer of cluster bean, accounting for 80% production of the world's total, while the Rajasthan, Gujarat and Kutch regions occupy the largest areas (82.1% of total) dedicated to guar cultivation. In addition to its cultivation in India, the crop is also grown as a cash crop in other parts of the world. Several commercial growers have converted their crops to guar production to support the increasing demand for guar and other organic crops in the United States. Guar can be an economically viable crop even in the ongoing drought conditions of the southwest United States.

=== Varieties ===
Pusa Naubahar and Pusa Sadabahar. Seeds at the rate of 30 kilograms/hectare (9–11 lb/acre) are planted at a spacing of 45–60 × 20–30 cm (18–24 × 8–12 in) in February–March and June–July. During the rainy season, seeds are sown 2–3 cm (~1 in) deep on ridges and in furrows during summer months. FYM is applied at the rate of 25 tonnes/ha (11.1 tons/acre). N, P_{2}O_{5} and K_{2}O recommendation for the crop is 20:60:80 kg/ha (18:53:71 lb/acre). Average yield is 5 to 6 tonnes/ha (2.2–2.6 tons/acre). Meager information is available for genetic variability in cluster bean addressing the qualitative traits (Pathak et al. 2011).

== Uses ==
=== Guar plant ===
Agriculture

- Forage: Guar plants can be used as cattle feed, but due to hydrocyanic acid in its beans, only mature beans can be used.
- Green manure: Guar plantings increase the yield of subsequent crops as this legume conserves soil nutrient content.

Domestic use

- Vegetable: Guar leaves can be used like spinach, and the pods are prepared like salad or vegetables. Its beans are nutritious, and like all raw dried beans must be cooked to destroy antinutrients including trypsin inhibitors.

=== Guar gum ===
The seed of the guar bean contains a large endosperm. This endosperm consists of a large polysaccharide of galactose and mannose. This polymer is water-soluble and exhibits a viscosifying effect in water. Guar gum has a multitude of different applications in food products, industrial products, and extractive industry.

==== Food ====
In several food and beverages guar gum is used as additive to change its viscosity or as fiber source.

Food	Function
Baked goods	Dough improver
Cheese	Texture improver
Ice Cream	Smaller ice crystals
Fried Products	Oil uptake reduction

Partially hydrolyzed guar gum (PHGG) is produced by the partial enzymatic hydrolysis of guaran, the galactomannan of the endosperm of guar seeds (guar gum). It is a neutral polysaccharide consisting of a mannose backbone chain with single galactose side units occurring on almost two out of every three mannose units. The average molecular weight is about 25,000 daltons. This gives a PHGG that still assays and functions as a soluble dietary fiber.

PHGG as sold commercially is completely soluble, acid and heat stable, unaffected by ions, and will not gel at high concentrations. Commercial PHGG is approximately 75% dietary fiber and has minimal effect on taste and texture in food and beverage items. PHGG is fully fermentable in the large bowel, with a high rate of volatile fatty acid formation. The pH of the feces is lowered along with an increase in fecal bulk that mainly consists of bacterial cell mass and water. Clinical studies have demonstrated a prebiotic effect of PHGG. Studies have shown that PHGG can be used to maintain regularity. PHGG is used in foods for particulate suspension, emulsification, antistaling, ice crystal control, and reduced fat baked goods.

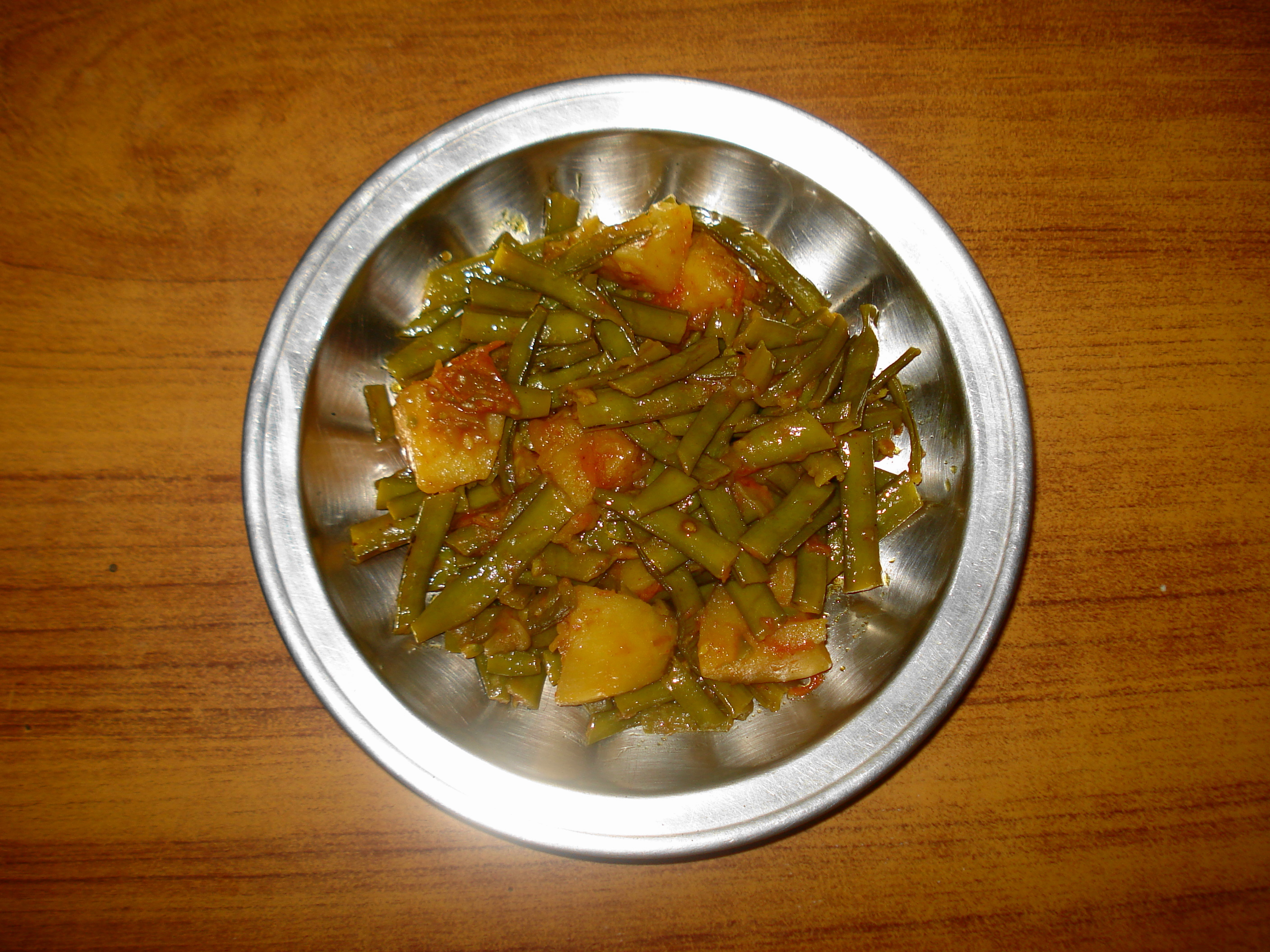
Gawar phali with aaloo (guar bean with potatoes) (India)

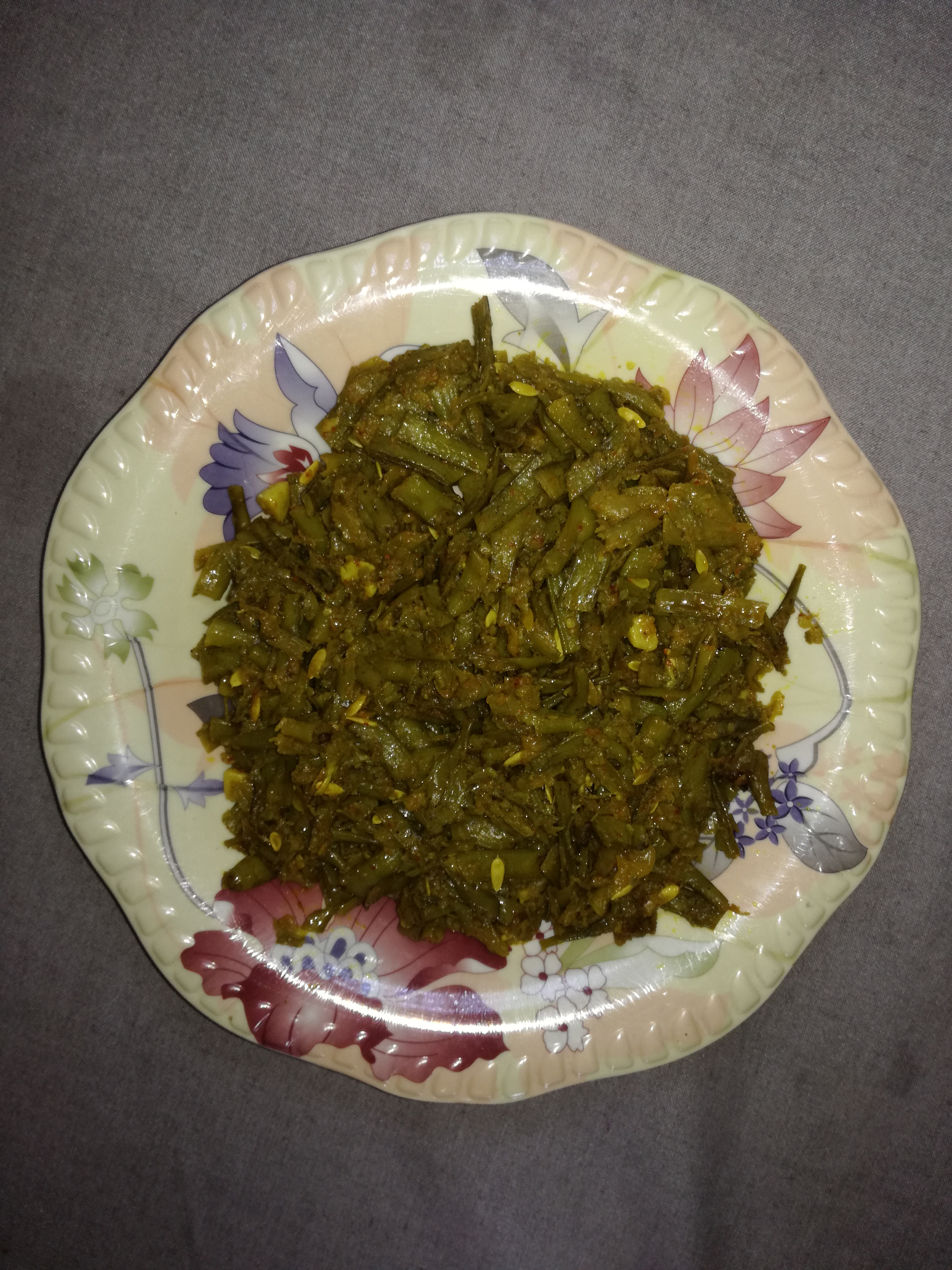
Guar chibhad ji bhaaji is a popular Thari dish

==== Industry ====
Derivatives of guar gum that have been further reacted are used in industrial applications, such as the paper and textile industries, ore flotation, the manufacture of explosives and hydraulic fracturing (fracking) of oil and gas formations. Guar gum is often crosslinked with boron or chromium ions to make it more stable and heat-resistant. The crosslinking of guar with metal ions results in a gel that does not block the formation and helps efficiently in formation cleaning process. Guar and its derivatives make gel complexes with ions of aluminium, zirconium, titanium, chromium and boron. The borate–guar reaction is reversible, and depends on the pH (hydrogen ion concentration) of the solution. This reaction is used to give the toy "slime" its consistency. Crosslinking of guar with borate occurs at high pH (approximately 9–10) of the solution. Guar gum has proven as useful substitute for locust bean gum (made from carob seeds).

==== Feeds ====
Guar meal korma and guar meal churi are widely used as raw material for producing various kinds of cattle feeds, aqua feeds, fish feeds, poultry feeds, dairy feeds, swine feeds, etc.

==== Fracking agent ====
The use of guar gum in the hydraulic fracturing (fracking) extraction of oil and shale gas has increased demand substantially. Only 10% of Indian production is used domestically. The remaining 90% is exported for shale gas and oil industries. Consequently, many former cotton or wheat fields are converted into guar fields as production costs are lower. The increase of guar gum prices also has other reasons.
