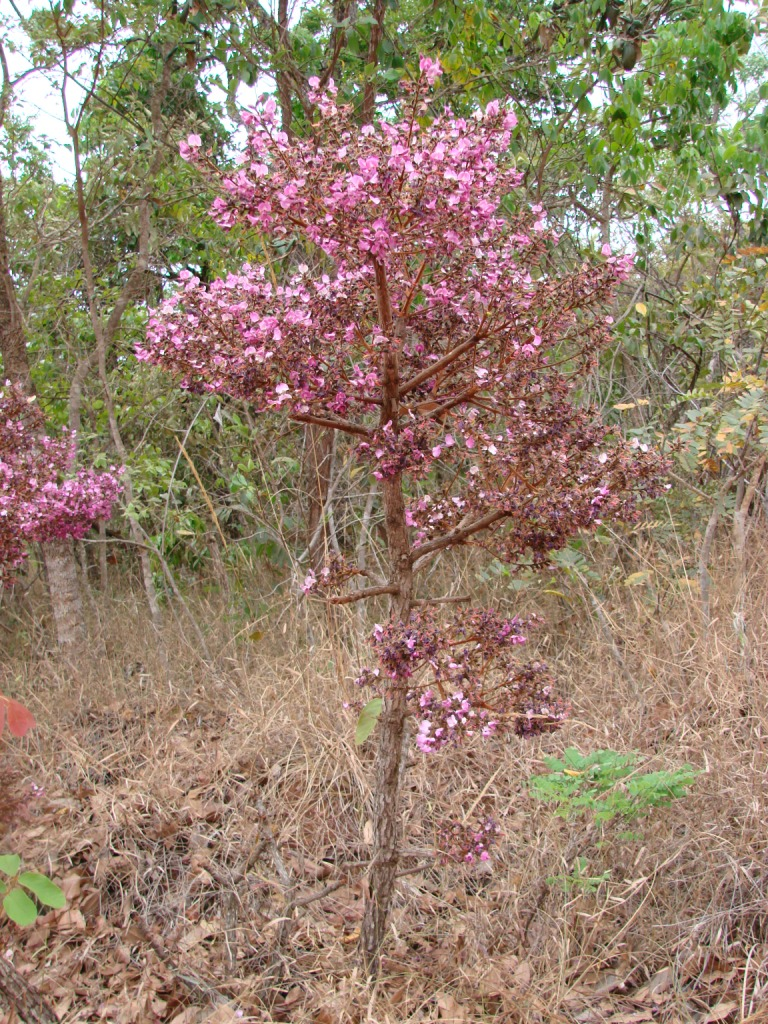
- Andira humilis

Scientific classification
- Kingdom: Plantae
- Clade: Tracheophytes
- Clade: Angiosperms
- Clade: Eudicots
- Clade: Rosids
- Order: Fabales
- Family: Fabaceae
- Subfamily: Faboideae
- Clade: Meso-Papilionoideae
- Clade: Andira clade
- Genus: Andira; Lam., nom. cons.

Species
- See text.

Synonyms
- Andira Juss., nom. rej.; Lumbricidia Vell.; Poltolobium C.Presl; Skolemora Arruda; Spigelia P.Browne, nom. illeg.

= Andira =

Genus of legumes

Andira is a genus of flowering plants in the legume family, Fabaceae. It is distributed in the tropical Americas, except for A. inermis, which also occurs in Africa. It was formerly assigned to the tribe Dalbergieae, but molecular phylogenetic studies in 2012 and 2013 placed it in a unique clade within subfamily Faboideae named the Andira clade.

Compared to other Faboideae the genus has unusual systems of root nodules and fruits, which are drupes. In most species the fruits are dispersed by bats, and in some they are dispersed by rodents. They may also be dispersed on water.

Plants of the genus are used in traditional medicine in Brazil to treat fever and as purgatives and vermifuges. The treatments are toxic in high doses, however. Chemical compounds isolated from the genus include isoflavones, flavanols, glycosides, pterocarpans, chromone, and ursolic acid.

== Species ==
As of April 2023, Plants of the World Online accepted the following species:

- Andira anthelmia (Vell.) J.F.Macbr.
- Andira carvalhoi R.T.Penn. & H.C.Lima
- Andira chigorodensis R.T.Penn.
- Andira cordata Arroyo ex R.T.Penn. & H.C.Lima
- Andira coriacea Pulle
- Andira cubensis Benth.
- Andira cujabensis Benth.
- Andira fraxinifolia Benth.
- Andira galeottiana Standl.
- Andira grandistipula Amshoff
- Andira humilis Mart. ex Benth.
- Andira inermis (W.Wright) Kunth ex DC.
- Andira jaliscensis R.T.Penn.
- Andira legalis (Vell.) Toledo
- Andira macrocarpa R.T.Penn.
- Andira macrothyrsa Ducke
- Andira marauensis Mattos
- Andira micrantha Ducke
- Andira multistipula Ducke
- Andira nitida Mart. ex Benth.
- Andira ormosioides Benth.
- Andira parviflora Ducke
- Andira praecox Arroyo ex R.T.Penn.
- Andira spectabilis Saldanha
- Andira surinamensis (Bondt) Splitg. ex Pulle
- Andira taurotesticulata R.T.Penn.
- Andira tervequinata R.T.Penn., Aymard & Cuello
- Andira trifoliolata Ducke
- Andira unifoliolata Ducke
- Andira vermifuga (Mart.) Benth.
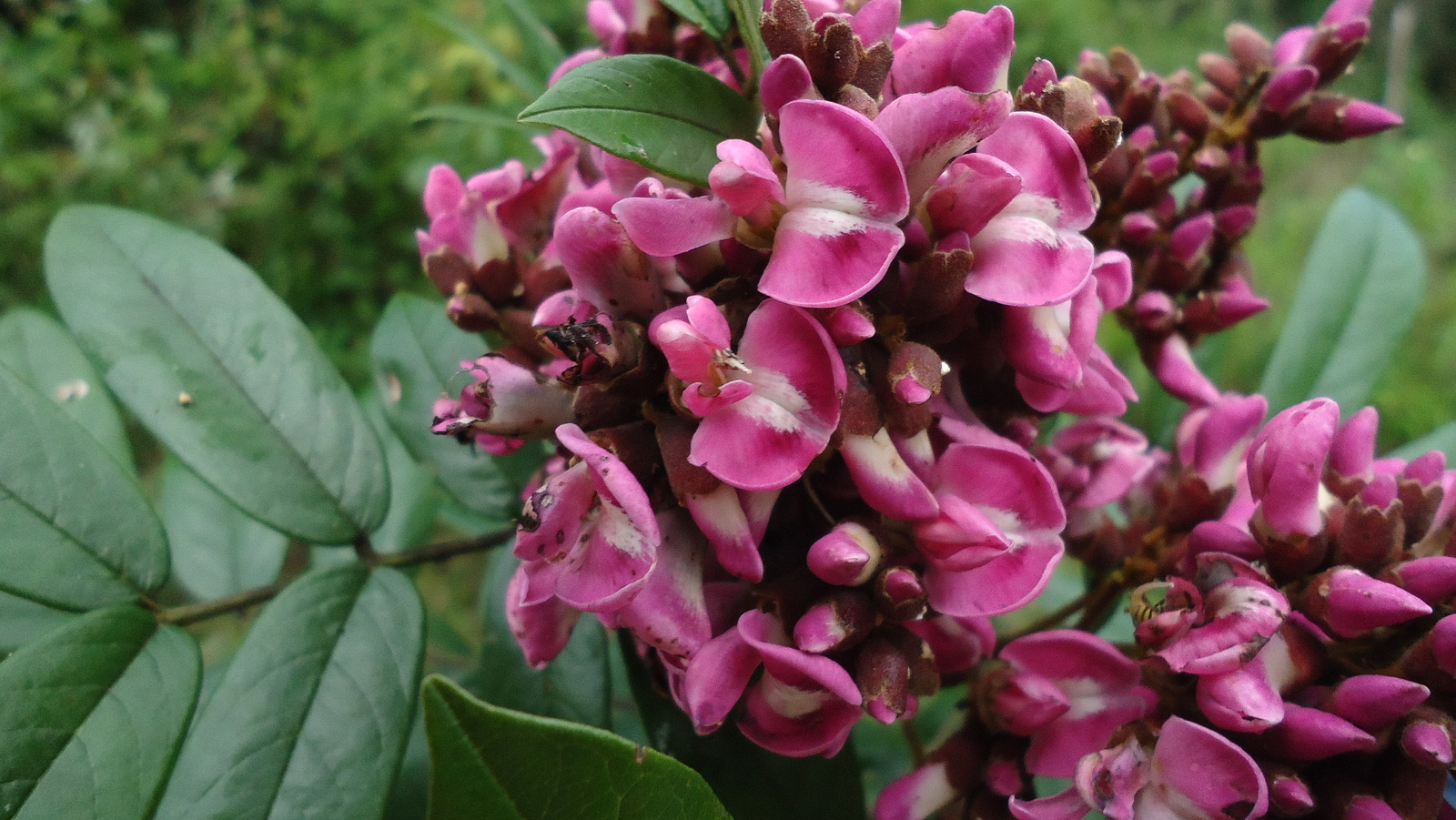
Andira fraxinifolia

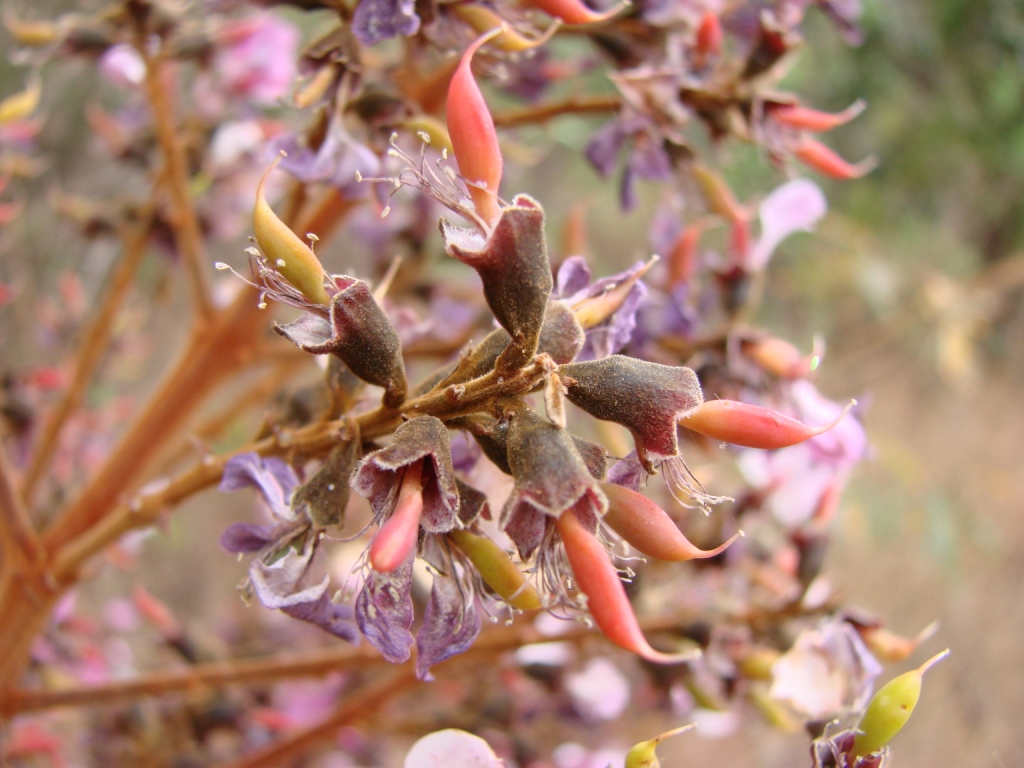
Andira vermifuga
