= Hymenolobium =

Scientific classification
- Kingdom: Plantae
- Clade: Embryophytes
- Clade: Tracheophytes
- Clade: Spermatophytes
- Clade: Angiosperms
- Clade: Eudicots
- Clade: Rosids
- Order: Fabales
- Family: Fabaceae
- Subfamily: Faboideae
- Clade: Meso-Papilionoideae
- Clade: Andira clade
- Genus: Hymenolobium; Benth. (1860)

Species
- 14; see text

Genus of legumes

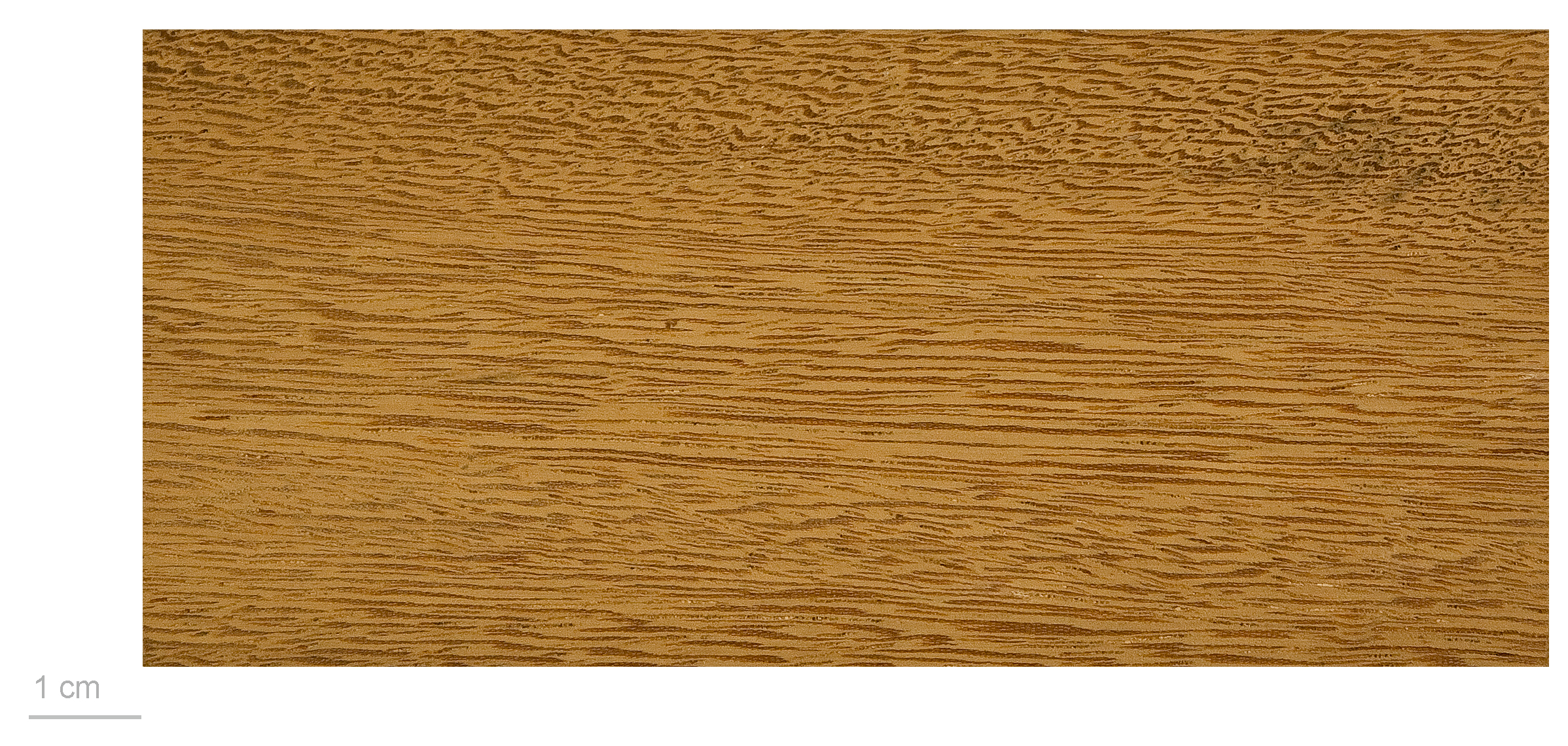
Wood of a Hymenolobium sp.

Hymenolobium is a genus of flowering plants in the family Fabaceae. It includes 14 species of trees native to Central America and northern South America, ranging from Honduras to Bolivia and southeastern Brazil. Most species are native to Brazil, the Guianas, and Venezuela, with one extending into Peru, another into Ecuador, and one native to Central America. Trees are typically very tall and emergent in tropical humid lowland rain forest.

The genus belongs to the subfamily Faboideae. It was formerly assigned to the tribe Dalbergieae, but recent molecular phylogenetic evidence has placed it in a unique clade named the Andira clade.

== Species ==
14 species are accepted.

- Hymenolobium alagoanum Ducke
  - var. alagoanum Ducke
  - var. parvifolium H. C. Lima
- Hymenolobium excelsum Ducke
- Hymenolobium flavum Kleinhoonte
- Hymenolobium grazielanum H.C.Lima
- Hymenolobium heringeranum Rizzini
- Hymenolobium heterocarpum Ducke
- Hymenolobium janeirense Kuhlm.
- Hymenolobium mesoamericanum H.C.Lima
- Hymenolobium modestum Ducke
- Hymenolobium nitidum Benth.
- Hymenolobium petraeum Ducke
- Hymenolobium pulcherrimum Ducke
- Hymenolobium sericeum Ducke
- Hymenolobium velutinum Ducke
