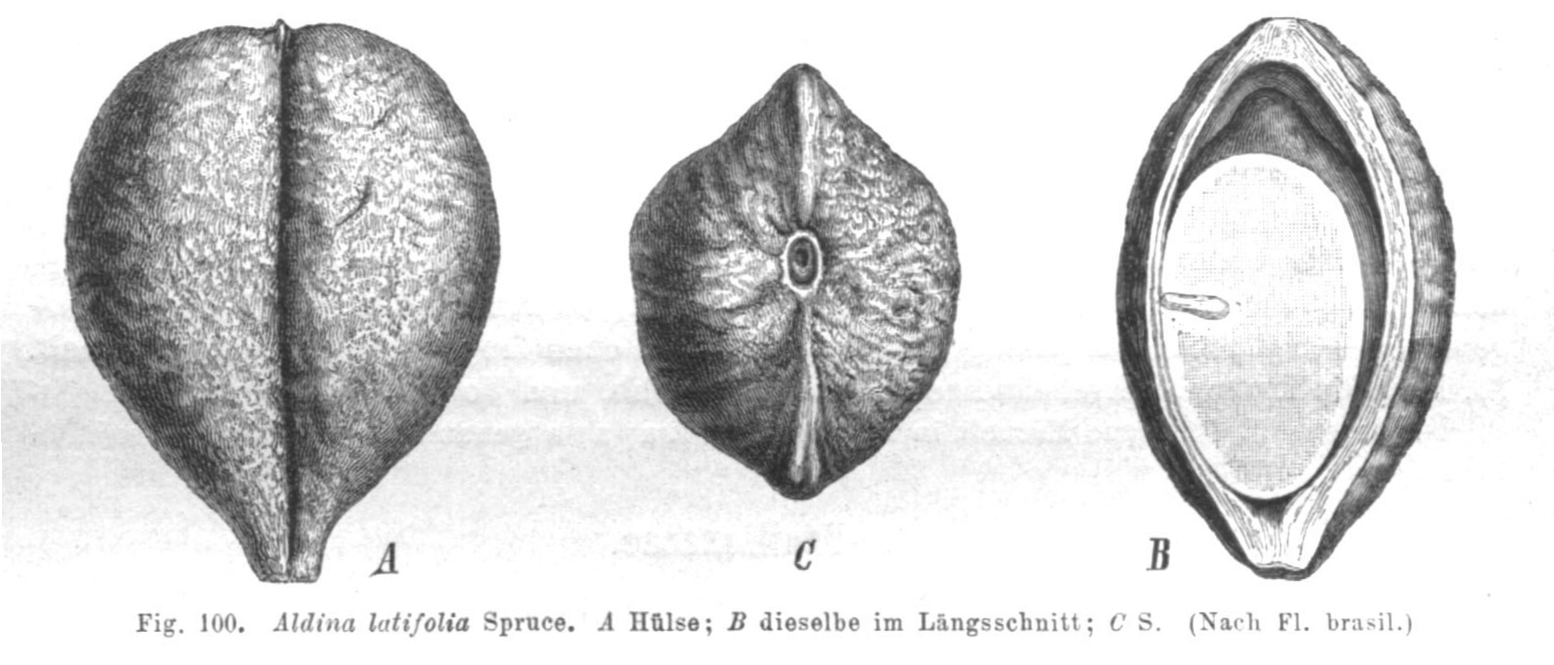
- Aldina latifolia

Scientific classification
- Kingdom: Plantae
- Clade: Embryophytes
- Clade: Tracheophytes
- Clade: Spermatophytes
- Clade: Angiosperms
- Clade: Eudicots
- Clade: Rosids
- Order: Fabales
- Family: Fabaceae
- Subfamily: Faboideae
- Clade: Meso-Papilionoideae
- Clade: Andira clade
- Genus: Aldina; Endl. (1841)

Species
- 17; see text

Synonyms
- Allania Benth. (1840)

= Aldina =

Genus of legumes

Aldina is a genus of trees in the Fabaceae native to the Guiana Shield and northern Amazonia. It is found in lowland humid forests. It is included in the Andira clade.

== Species ==
Aldina comprises the following species:

- Aldina amazonica M. Yu. Gontsch. & Yakovlev
- Aldina aurea Cowan
- Aldina berryi Cowan & Steyerm.
- Aldina discolor Benth.
- Aldina elliptica Cowan
- Aldina heterophylla Benth.
- Aldina insignis (Benth.) Endl.
- Aldina kunhardtiana Cowan
- Aldina latifolia Benth.
- Aldina macrophylla Benth.
- Aldina microphylla M. Yu. Gontsch. & Yakovlev
- Aldina occidentalis Ducke
- Aldina paulberryi G.A. Aymard
- Aldina petiolulata Cowan
- Aldina polyphylla Ducke
- Aldina reticulata Cowan
- Aldina yapacanensis Cowan

== Species names with uncertain taxonomic status ==
The status of the following species is unresolved:

- Aldina aquae-negrae M.Yu.Gontsch. & Yakovlev
- Aldina barnebyana M.Yu.Gontsch. & Yakovlev
- Aldina diplogyne Stergios & Aymard
- Aldina polycarpa Stergios & Aymard
- Aldina rio-negrae M.Yu.Gontsch. & Yakovlev
- Aldina speciosa M.Yu.Gontsch. & Yakovlev
- Aldina stergiosii M.Yu.Gontsch. & Yakovlev
