= River Almond =

River Almond may refer to:

- River Almond, Lothian, which goes by Livingston and Cramond
- River Almond, Perth and Kinross, a tributary of the River Tay
- Andira inermis, known as river almond, a tree native to Central and South America
