= Cicer reticulatum =

Scientific classification
- Kingdom: Plantae
- Clade: Tracheophytes
- Clade: Angiosperms
- Clade: Eudicots
- Clade: Rosids
- Order: Fabales
- Family: Fabaceae
- Subfamily: Faboideae
- Genus: Cicer
- Species: C. reticulatum

Binomial name
- Cicer reticulatum Ladiz.

Species of flowering plant

Cicer reticulatum is a species of flowering plant in the family Fabaceae, native to southeastern Turkey. It is the wild progenitor of the cultivated chickpea (Cicer arietinum) and is found primarily near Savur in the Mardin district. The species is characterised by its prostrate growth habit, distinctive reticulated seed surface pattern, and strong genetic compatibility with domestic chickpeas. First described by the botanist Gideon Ladizinsky in 1975, C. reticulatum has demonstrated its close evolutionary relationship to cultivated chickpea through hybridisation experiments that produce fertile offspring and through genomic studies showing 99.93% similarity between their chloroplast genomes. It grows naturally alongside wild peas and lentils in what is historically known as part of the Fertile Crescent.

== Description ==
Cicer reticulatum has a prostrate growth habit, unlike the typically erect cultivated chickpea. Upon maturity, its dry pods remain attached for a considerable period before eventually shedding seeds by bursting open on the ground.

Seeds of C. reticulatum are characterised by a distinctly textured surface with tubercles (small rounded projections) of varying sizes, forming a reticulated (net-like) pattern that is whitish along the ridges.

== Distribution and habitat ==
Cicer reticulatum has a limited known distribution, found specifically about 9 km east of Savur, in the Mardin district of southeast Turkey.

In its native habitat, C. reticulatum co-occurs naturally with wild forms of pea and lentil, in a region recognised as part of the historical Fertile Crescent.

== Taxonomy ==
Cicer reticulatum was first described as a distinct species by the botanist Gideon Ladizinsky in 1975 following its discovery in Southeast Turkey. It belongs to the genus Cicer, a group of legumes commonly referred to as chickpeas. Initially, the known wild chickpea species from the Middle East included C. judaicum, C. pinnatifidum, and C. bijugum, but morphological and biochemical analyses indicated these were not closely related to the cultivated chickpea (Cicer arietinum).

In contrast, C. reticulatum, along with another wild species, C. echinospermum, closely resemble the cultivated chickpea morphologically and biochemically, suggesting a direct genetic relationship. Through breeding experiments, C. reticulatum readily hybridised with cultivated chickpea lines, showing regular chromosome pairing during meiosis and producing fertile hybrids. This fertility and genetic compatibility strongly suggest that C. reticulatum is the direct wild progenitor of cultivated chickpeas.

In contrast, hybrids between C. echinospermum and cultivated chickpea were highly sterile due to significant chromosomal rearrangements, underscoring the more distant relationship between those species. Consequently, C. reticulatum is now generally accepted as representing the ancestral wild form from which cultivated chickpeas were domesticated. Later genetic studies confirmed its lineage as the wild ancestor of Cicer arietinum, the chickpea or garbanzo.

== Chloroplast genome ==
The chloroplast genome (cpDNA) of Cicer reticulatum is distinctively organised compared to typical land plants, consisting of 125,794 base pairs divided into one large single-copy (LSC), one small single-copy (SSC), and only one inverted repeat (IR) region. This single-IR configuration, known as an inverted repeat-lacking chloroplast genome (IRLC), is characteristic of certain legumes, including the genus Cicer. Comparative analysis has revealed a considerable similarity of 99.93% between the chloroplast genomes of C. reticulatum and its cultivated descendant, C. arietinum, emphasising their close evolutionary relationship. Analysis of genetic markers identified specific chloroplast genes (clpP and ycf1) showing significant nucleotide diversity, suggesting potential utility in phylogenetic studies and species identification within the genus.

Further genomic analysis uncovered 103 simple sequence repeats (SSRs), dominated by mononucleotide repeats, particularly adenine/thymine (A/T) motifs, as well as various repetitive sequences including forward and palindromic repeats. These repeat sequences can serve as informative genetic markers for examining genetic variation and evolutionary relationships among chickpea species. Phylogenetic analysis based on chloroplast genomes confirmed the close affinity of C. reticulatum to cultivated chickpea, with both species forming a clearly separate group from other wild relatives, such as C. echinospermum and C. bijugum.
