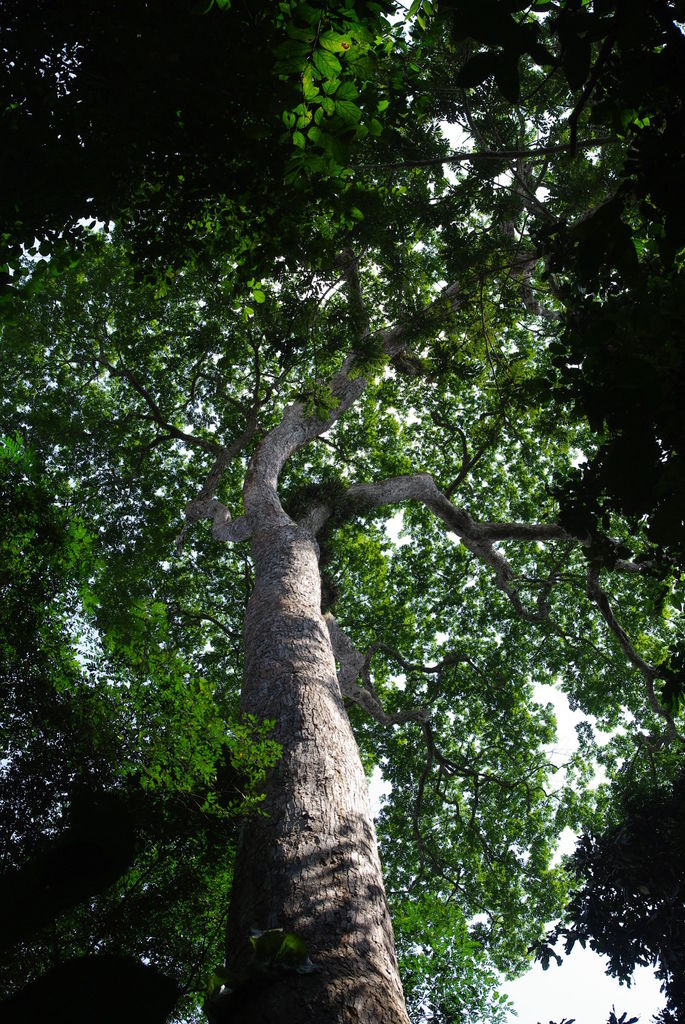
- Amphimas pterocarpoides

Scientific classification
- Kingdom: Plantae
- Clade: Tracheophytes
- Clade: Angiosperms
- Clade: Eudicots
- Clade: Rosids
- Order: Fabales
- Family: Fabaceae
- Subfamily: Faboideae
- Clade: Meso-Papilionoideae
- Genus: Amphimas; Pierre ex Harms

Species
- Amphimas ferrugineus Pierre ex Pellegr.; Amphimas pterocarpoides Harms; Amphimas tessmannii Harms

= Amphimas =

Genus of legumes

Amphimas is a small genus of flowering plants in the family Fabaceae. It belongs to the subfamily Faboideae. It is a west African tree used for medicine and for wood. Amphimas was traditionally assigned to the tribe Sophoreae; however, recent molecular phylogenetic analyses reassigned Amphimas into an unspecified position in the Meso-Papilionoideae.
