= Andira clade =

Scientific classification
- Kingdom: Plantae
- Clade: Tracheophytes
- Clade: Angiosperms
- Clade: Eudicots
- Clade: Rosids
- Order: Fabales
- Family: Fabaceae
- Subfamily: Faboideae
- Clade: Meso-Papilionoideae
- Clade: Andira clade Cardoso et al. 2012

Genera
- Andira Lam.; Hymenolobium Benth.; Aldina Endl.

Clade of legumes

The Andira clade is a predominantly Neotropical, monophyletic clade of the flowering plant subfamily Faboideae (or Papilionaceae). The members of this clade were formerly included in tribe Dalbergieae, but this placement was questioned due to differences in wood anatomy and fruit, seed, seedling, floral, and vegetative characters. Recent molecular phylogenetic evidence has shown that they belong to a unique evolutionary lineage. It is predicted to have diverged from the other legume lineages in the late Eocene).

== Description ==
The name of this clade is informal and is not assumed to have any particular taxonomic rank like the names authorized by the ICBN or the ICPN. The clade does not currently have a node-based definition, but several morphological synapomorphies have been identified: "mostly fascicled leaves and densely flowered paniculate inflorescences at distal branch ends, [...] truly papilionate flowers involving petal differentiation and stamen connation", and "divergent fruit morphologies" (drupaceous in Andira and laterally compressed samaras in Hymenolobium).
