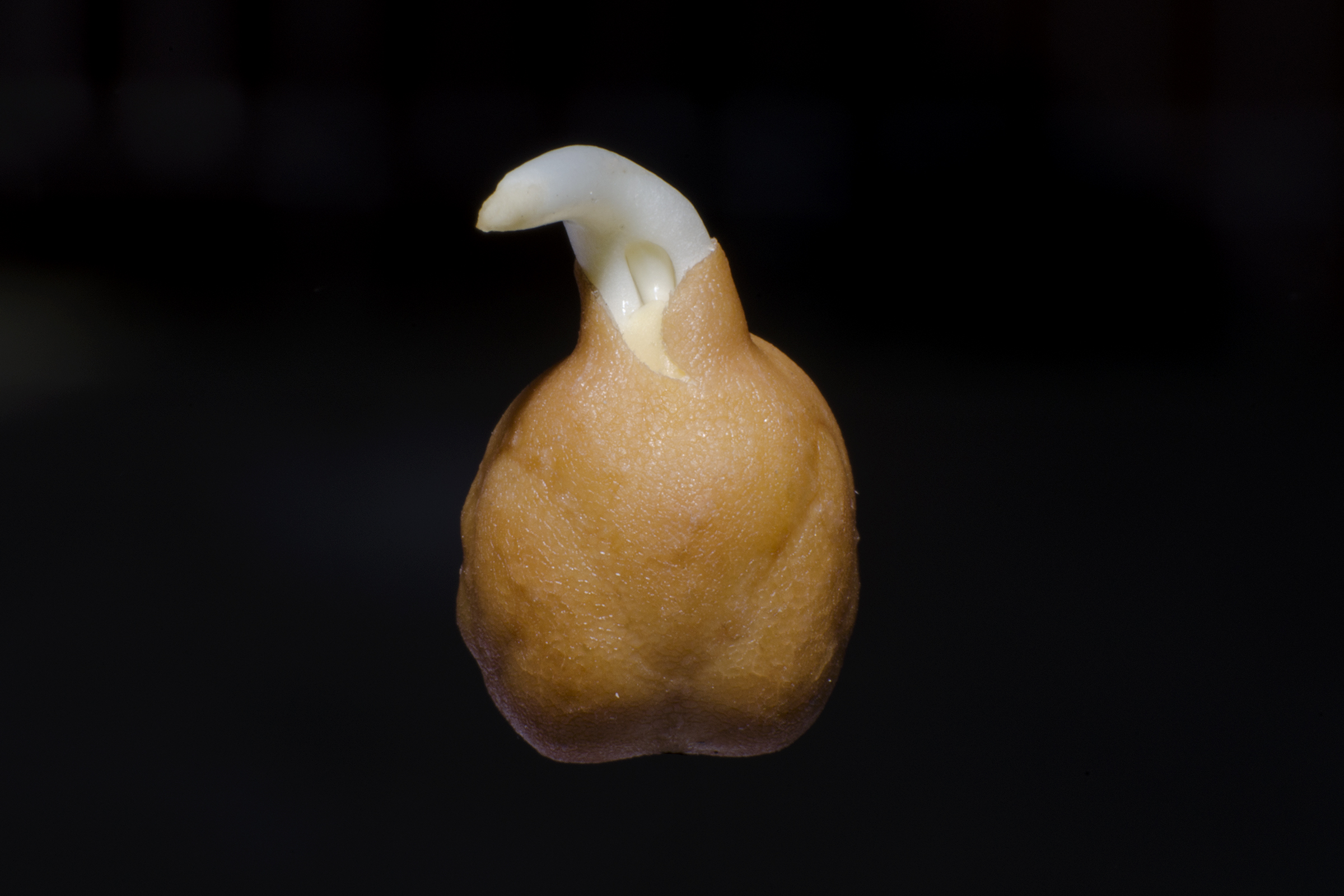
- Sprouted chickpea

Scientific classification
- Kingdom: Plantae
- Clade: Tracheophytes
- Clade: Angiosperms
- Clade: Eudicots
- Clade: Rosids
- Order: Fabales
- Family: Fabaceae
- Subfamily: Faboideae
- Genus: Cicer
- Species: C. arietinum

Binomial name
- Cicer arietinum L.

Synonyms
- Cicer album hort.; Cicer arientinium L. [Spelling variant]; Cicer arientinum L. [Spelling variant]; Cicer edessanum Bornm.; Cicer grossum Salisb.; Cicer nigrum hort.; Cicer physodes Rchb.; Cicer rotundum Alef.; Cicer sativum Schkuhr; Cicer sintenisii Bornm.; Ononis crotalarioides M.E.Jones

= Chickpea =

Chickpeas

Species of flowering plant with edible seeds

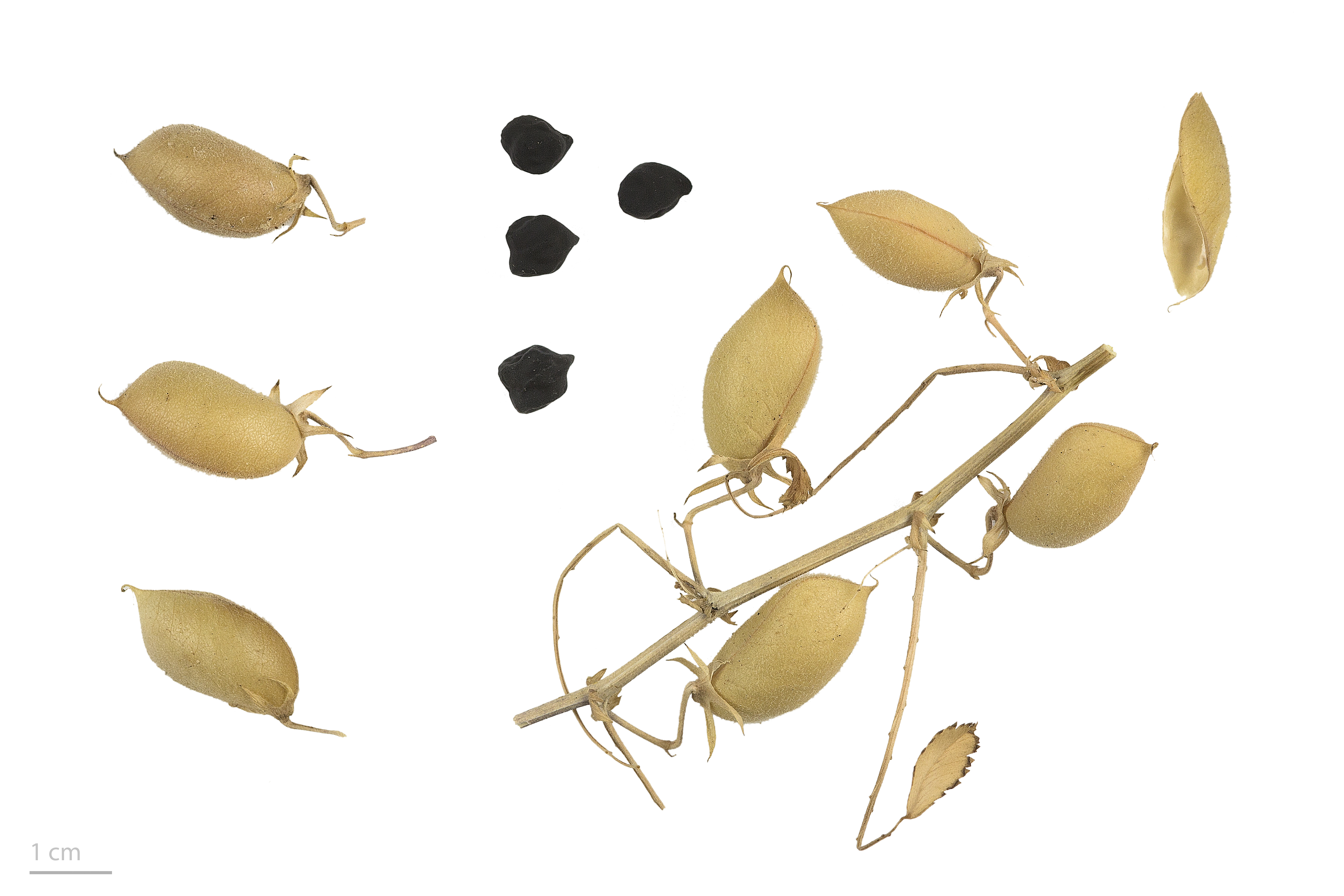
Cicer arietinum noir – MHNT

The chickpea or chick pea (Cicer arietinum) is an annual legume of the family Fabaceae, subfamily Faboideae, cultivated for its edible seeds. Its different types are variously known as gram, Bengal gram, chana, garbanzo, garbanzo bean, or Egyptian pea. It is one of the earliest cultivated legumes, the oldest archaeological evidence of which was found in Syria.

Chickpeas are high in protein. The chickpea is a key ingredient in Mediterranean and Middle Eastern cuisines, used in hummus, and, when soaked and coarsely ground with herbs and spices, then made into patties and fried, falafel. As an important part of Indian cuisine, it is used in salads, soups, stews, and curries. In 2023, India accounted for 75% of global chickpea production.

== Description ==
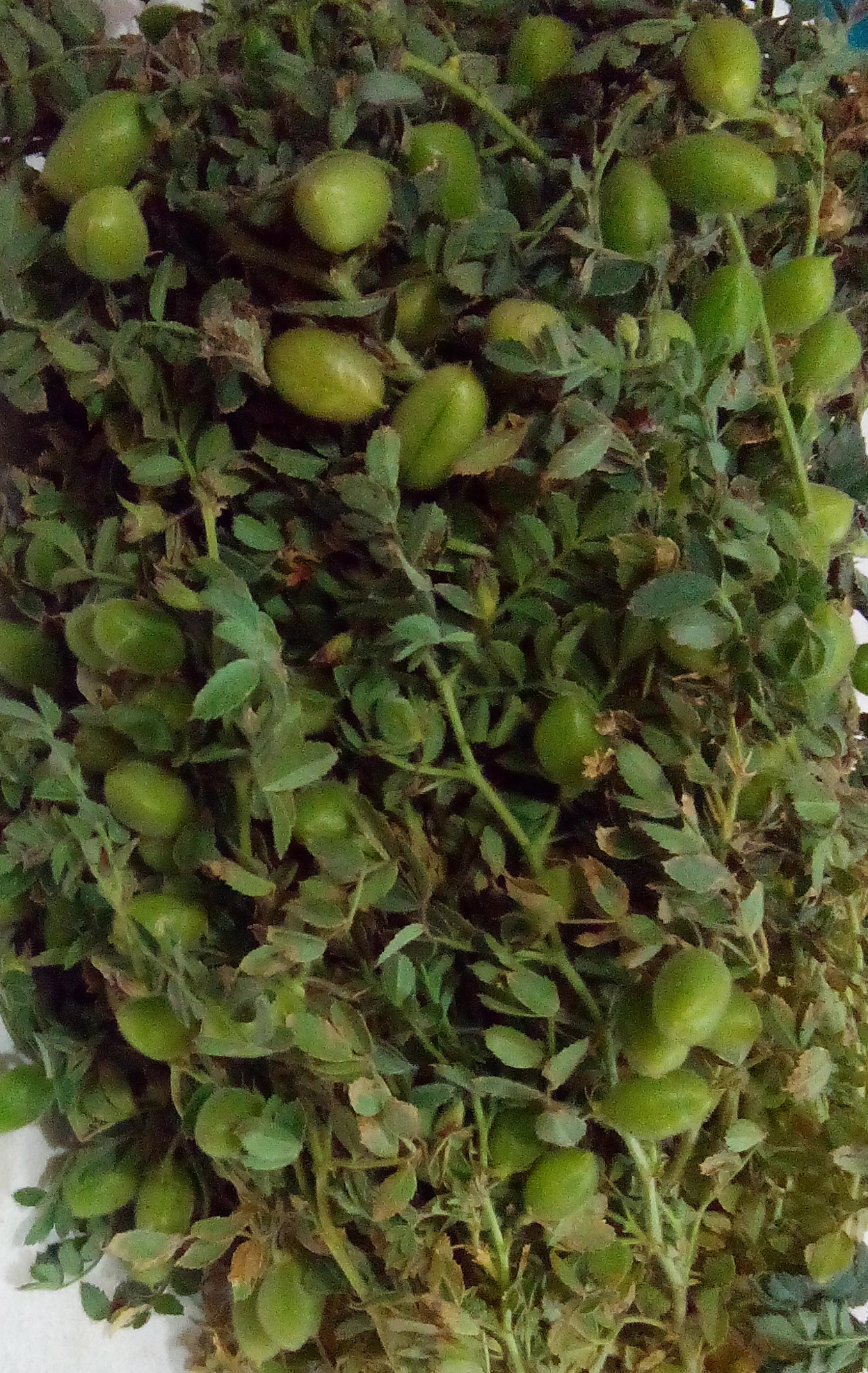
Flowering and fruiting chickpea plant

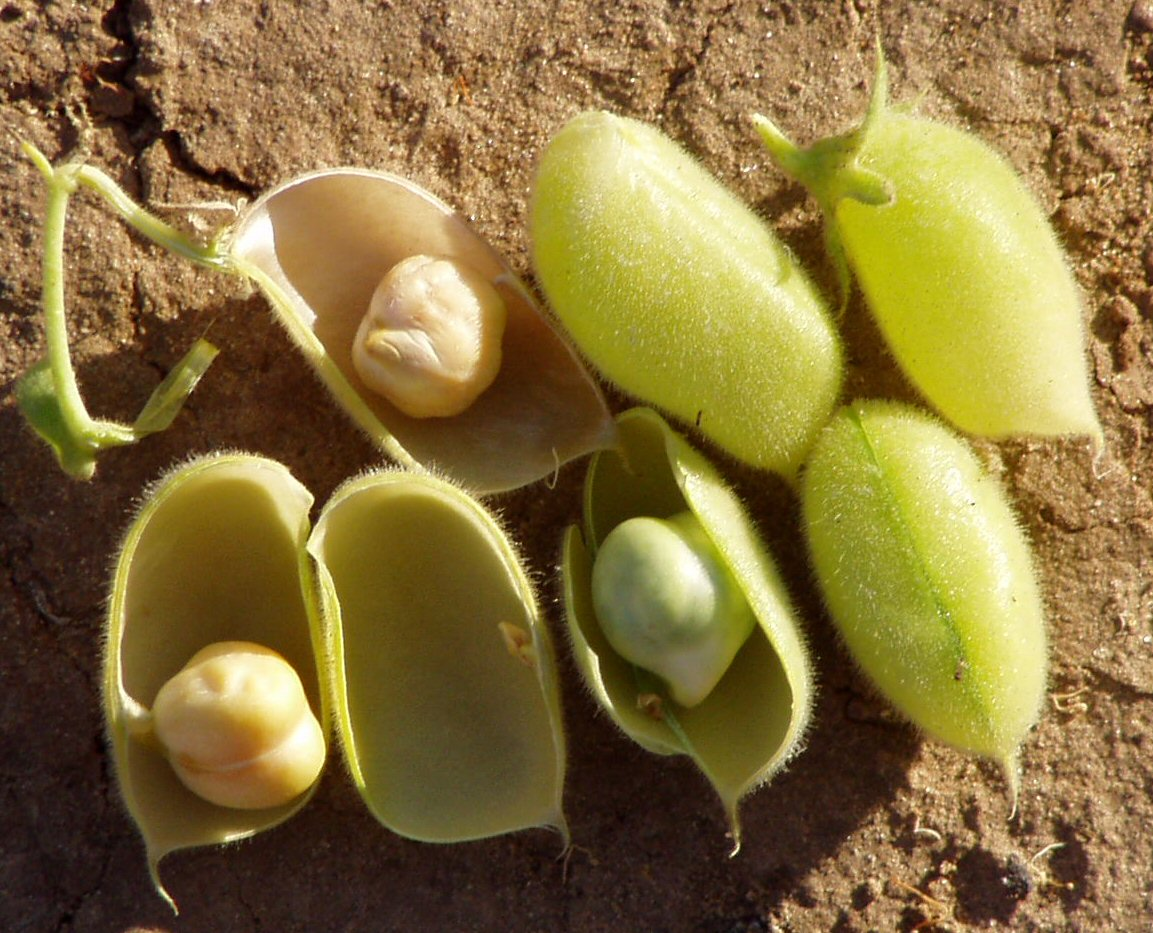
Chickpea pods

The plant grows to 20–50 cm (8–20 in) high and has small, feathery leaves on either side of the stem. It has white flowers with blue, violet, or pink veins. Chickpeas are a type of pulse, with each seedpod containing two or three peas.

=== Varieties ===
Desi is the most common variety of chickpea in South Asia, Ethiopia, Mexico, and Iran, typically grown in semi-arid tropics, also called Bengal gram. It has small, dark seeds and a rough coat; coloring can be black, green, or speckled. In Hindi, it is called desi chana 'native chickpea', or kala chana 'black chickpea', and in Assamese and Bengali, it is called boot or chholaa boot. It can be hulled and split to make chana dal.

Kabuli is the most common variety of chickpea in the Mediterranean and in the Middle East, typically grown in temperate regions. It is larger than Desi varieties and tan-colored, with a smooth coat. It was introduced to India in the 18th century from Afghanistan and is called kabuli chana in Hindi.

== Taxonomy ==
Chickpea (Cicer arietinum) is a member of the genus Cicer and the legume family, Fabaceae. Carl Linnaeus described it in the first edition of Species Plantarum in 1753, marking the first use of binomial nomenclature for the plant. Linnaeus classified the plant in the genus Cicer, which was the Latin term for chickpeas, crediting Joseph Pitton de Tournefort's 1694 publication Elemens de botanique, ou Methode pour connoitre les plantes which called it "Cicer arietinum". Tournefort himself repeated the names of the plant that had been used since antiquity.

The specific epithet arietinum is based on the shape of the seed resembling the head of a ram. In Ancient Greece, Theophrastus described one of the varieties of chickpea called "rams" in Historia Plantarum. The Roman writer on agriculture Lucius Junius Moderatus Columella wrote about chickpeas in the second book of De re rustica, in about 64 CE, and said that the chickpea was called arietillum. Pliny the Elder expanded further in Naturalis Historia that this name was due to the seed's resemblance to the head of a ram.

Cicer arietinum is the type species of the genus. The wild species C. reticulatum is interfertile with C. arietinum and is considered to be the progenitor of the cultivated species. Cicer echinospermum is closely related and can be hybridized with both C. reticulatum and C. arietinum, but the hybrids generally produce infertile seeds.

=== Genome sequencing ===
Sequencing of the genome has been completed for 90 chickpea genotypes, including several wild species. A collaboration of 20 research organizations, led by the International Crops Research Institute for the Semi-Arid Tropics (ICRISAT), sequenced CDC Frontier, a kabuli chickpea variety, and identified more than 28,000 genes and several million genetic markers.

== History ==
=== Domestication ===
The chickpea was originally domesticated along with wheat, barley, peas, and lentils during the First Agricultural Revolution about 10,000 years ago. The closest evolutionary relative to chickpeas is Cicer reticulatum, a plant native to a relatively small area in the Southeastern part of modern-day Turkey and nearby areas in modern-day Syria. Initially, ancient hunter-gatherer cultures harvested wild plants that they encountered, but evidence of the cultivation of some domestic food crops from 7500 BCE and possibly earlier have been documented.

Archaeological sites in modern Syria, such as Tell El-Kerkh and Tell Abu Hureyra, have revealed remnant traces of peas, lentils, and fava beans, along with grain legumes including chickpeas, bitter vetch, and grass peas from the 8th millennium BCE. Samples from Tell El-Kerkh have been analyzed, revealing traces of both the cultivated C. arietinum and the wild C. reticulatum. Additional discoveries have been made at Çayönü in Turkey dating from between 7500 and 6800 BCE, and at Hacılar Höyük in Turkey that date from 5450 BCE.

Cultivation of domesticated chickpea is well documented from 3300 BCE onwards in Egypt and the Middle East. During the Neolithic Era, chickpea cultivation spread to the west and was established in present-day Greece by the late Neolithic Era. During the Bronze Age, chickpea cultivation spread to Crete and as far as upper Egypt, with specimens from 1400 BCE found at Deir el-Medina. At the same time, it spread to the east, and chickpeas from 1900 BCE were found at Tell Bazmusian. In the Indian subcontinent, archaeological evidence of chickpea cultivation at Lal Quila, Sanghol, Inamgaon, Nevasa, Hulas, Senuwar, and Daimabad date from between 1750 and 1500 BCE. By the Iron Age, cultivation had spread as far south as Lalibela in Ethiopia. The Spanish and Portuguese introduced chickpea cultivation to the New World in the 16th century.

The process of domestication involved the selective breeding of plants that produced large, palatable seeds that do not require a dormancy period, plants that have seeds that are easy to separate from the pods, plants with a predictable ripening period to allow a whole field to ripen at once, and plants with desirable physical forms. This selective breeding produced several different varieties of chickpeas. In Greece, Theophrastus wrote "Chickpeas ... differ in size, color, taste, and shape; there are the varieties called 'rams' and 'vetch-like' chickpeas, and the intermediate forms" in Historia Plantarum, written between 350 and 287 BCE.

One key selection factor in the domestication of chickpeas was the selection of a spring-sown cropping season. The evolutionary relatives of Cicer arietinum grow during the Winter and are harvested in the Spring. In the Near East, more than 80 percent of annual precipitation occurs between the months of December and February, while the long summers are hot and dry. Growing in the damp Winter months made the crops vulnerable to Ascochyta blight caused by Didymella rabiei, resulting in crop failures. Recorded evidence shows that by the Hellenistic period and the time of the Roman Empire, summer cropping of chickpeas was being practiced.

=== Etymology ===
The Proto-Indo-European roots *kek- and *k'ik'- that denoted both 'pea' and 'oat' appeared in the Pontic–Caspian steppe of Eastern Europe between 4,500 and 2,500 BCE. In the Indo-European migrations, regional dialects diverged and transformed into the ancient Indo-European languages. In most cases, the word came to be used for chickpeas. The Latin word cicer appeared around 700 BCE, which led to French pois chiche, and in turn chich-pease in Old English.

The Proto-Indo-European *erəgw[h]-, *eregw(h)o-, and *erogw(h)o-, denoted a pea. This evolved into the Greek word erebinthos, mentioned in The Iliad in around 800 BCE and in Theophrastus's Historia Plantarum, written around 300 BCE. This gave rise to the Spanish garbanzo, used in American English for the chickpea as early as 1759.

== Production ==
Chickpea production millions of tonnes
Country	2023	2024
India	12.3	11.0
Australia	0.94	2.27
Turkey	0.58	0.58
Russia	0.53	0.41
Ethiopia	0.45	0.44
Myanmar	0.41	0.42
World	16.5	16.9
Source: FAOSTAT of the United Nations

In 2023, world production of chickpeas was 16.5 million tonnes, led by India with 75% of the total, and Australia as a major secondary producer (table). In 2026, as a reaction to climate change, there were proposals to grow chickpeas commercially in Britain.

Production of chickpeas

Chickpea yield

=== Heat and nutrient cultivation ===
Agricultural yield for chickpeas is often based on genetic and phenotypic variability, which has recently been influenced by artificial selection. The uptake of macronutrients such as inorganic phosphorus or nitrogen is vital to the plant development of Cicer arietinum, commonly known as the perennial chickpea. Heat cultivation and macronutrient coupling are two relatively unknown methods used to increase the yield and size of the chickpea. Recent research has indicated that a combination of heat treatment along with the two vital macronutrients, phosphorus and nitrogen, is the most critical component to increasing the overall yield of Cicer arietinum.

Perennial chickpeas are a fundamental source of nutrition in animal feed as they are high-energy and protein sources for livestock. Unlike other food crops, the perennial chickpea can change its nutritional content in response to heat cultivation. Treating the chickpea with a constant heat source increases its protein content almost threefold. Consequently, the impact of heat cultivation affects the protein content of the chickpea itself and the ecosystem it supports. Increasing the height and size of chickpea plants involves using macronutrient fertilization with varying doses of inorganic phosphorus and nitrogen.

The level of phosphorus that a chickpea seed is exposed to during its lifecycle has a positive correlation relative to the height of the plant at full maturity. Increasing the levels of inorganic phosphorus at all doses incrementally increases the height of the chickpea plant. Thus, the seasonal changes in phosphorus soil content, as well as periods of drought that are known to be a native characteristic of the dry Middle-Eastern region where the chickpea is most commonly cultivated, have a strong effect on the growth of the plant itself. Plant yield is also affected by a combination of phosphorus nutrition and water supply, resulting in a 12% increase in crop yield.

Nitrogen nutrition is another factor that affects the yield of Cicer arietinum, although the application differs from other perennial crops regarding the levels administered to the plant. High doses of nitrogen inhibit the yield of the chickpea plant. Drought stress is a likely factor that inhibits nitrogen uptake and subsequent fixation in the roots of Cicer arietinum. The perennial chickpea's growth depends on the balance between nitrogen fixation and assimilation. The influence of drought stress, sowing date, and mineral nitrogen supply affects the plant's yield and size, with trials showing that Cicer arietinum differed from other plant species in its capacity to assimilate mineral nitrogen supply from the soil during drought stress. Additional minerals and micronutrients make the absorption process of nitrogen and phosphorus more available. Inorganic phosphate ions are generally attracted towards charged minerals such as iron and aluminium oxides.

=== Pathogens ===
From 1978 until 1995, the worldwide number of pathogens increased from 49 to 172, of which 35 were recorded in India. These pathogens are bacteria, fungi, viruses, mycoplasma, and nematodes, with high genotypic variation. The most widely distributed are Ascochyta rabiei (35 countries), Fusarium oxysporum f.sp. ciceris (32 countries) Uromyces ciceris-arietini (25 countries), bean leafroll virus (23 countries), and Macrophomina phaseolina (21 countries). Ascochyta disease emergence is favoured by wet weather; spores are carried to new plants by wind and water splash.

The fungus Fusarium oxysporum f.sp. ciceris, present in most of the major pulse crop-growing areas, causes regular yield reductions of 10 to 15%. Many plant hosts produce heat shock protein 70s including C. arietinum. In response to F. o. ciceris Gupta et al., 2017 finds C. arietinum produces an orthologue of AtHSP70-1, an Arabidopsis HSP70.

The stagnation of yield improvement over the last decades is linked to the susceptibility to pathogens. Research for yield improvement, such as an attempt to increase yield from 0.8 to 2.0 metric tons per hectare (0.32 to 0.80 long ton/acre; 0.36 to 0.89 short ton/acre) by breeding cold-resistant varieties, is always linked with pathogen-resistance breeding as pathogens such as Ascochyta rabiei and F. o. f.sp. ciceris flourish in conditions such as cold temperature. Research started selecting favourable genes for pathogen resistance and other traits through marker-assisted selection. This method is a promising sign for the future to achieve significant yield improvements.

== Uses ==
=== Culinary ===
In Spain, they are used in tapas such as cooked with spinach, as well as in cocido madrileño.

Hummus is the Arabic word for chickpeas, which are often cooked and ground into a paste and mixed with tahini (sesame seed paste), and lemon juice to make ḥummuṣ bi ṭaḥīna, usually called simply hummus in English. By the end of the 20th century, hummus had become common in American cuisine: by 2010, 5% of Americans consumed it regularly, and it was present at some point in 17% of American households.

In the Middle East, chickpeas are roasted, spiced, and eaten as a snack, leblebi.

As one of the most common vegetarian foods in the Indian subcontinent and in diaspora communities of many other countries, chickpeas are used to make curries and are served with bread or steamed rice. Dishes in Indian cuisine are made with chickpea flour, such as mirchi bajji and besan halwa.

Chickpea flour is used to make "Burmese tofu", first known among the Shan people of Burma. In South Asian cuisine, chickpea flour (besan) is used as a batter to coat vegetables before deep frying to make pakoras. The flour, known as kadlehittu in Kannada, is used for making the sweet dish Mysore pak.

The flour is used as a batter to coat vegetables and meats before frying or fried alone, such as panelle, a chickpea fritter from Sicily.

Chickpea flour is used to make the Italian flatbread farinata (or socca).

Ashkenazi Jews traditionally serve whole chickpeas, referred to as arbes (אַרבעס) in Yiddish, at the Shalom Zachar celebration for baby boys. The chickpeas are boiled until soft and served hot with salt and lots of ground black pepper.

Guasanas or garbanza is a Mexican chickpea street snack. The beans, while still green, are cooked in water and salt, kept in a steamer to maintain their humidity, and served in a plastic bag.

Preparation of a white chickpea chutney

A chickpea-derived liquid (aquafaba) can be used instead of eggwhite to make meringue or ice cream, with the residual pomace used as flour.

In 1793, ground, roasted chickpeas were noted by a German writer as a substitute for coffee in Europe. In the First World War, they were grown for this use in some areas of Germany. They are still sometimes brewed instead of coffee.

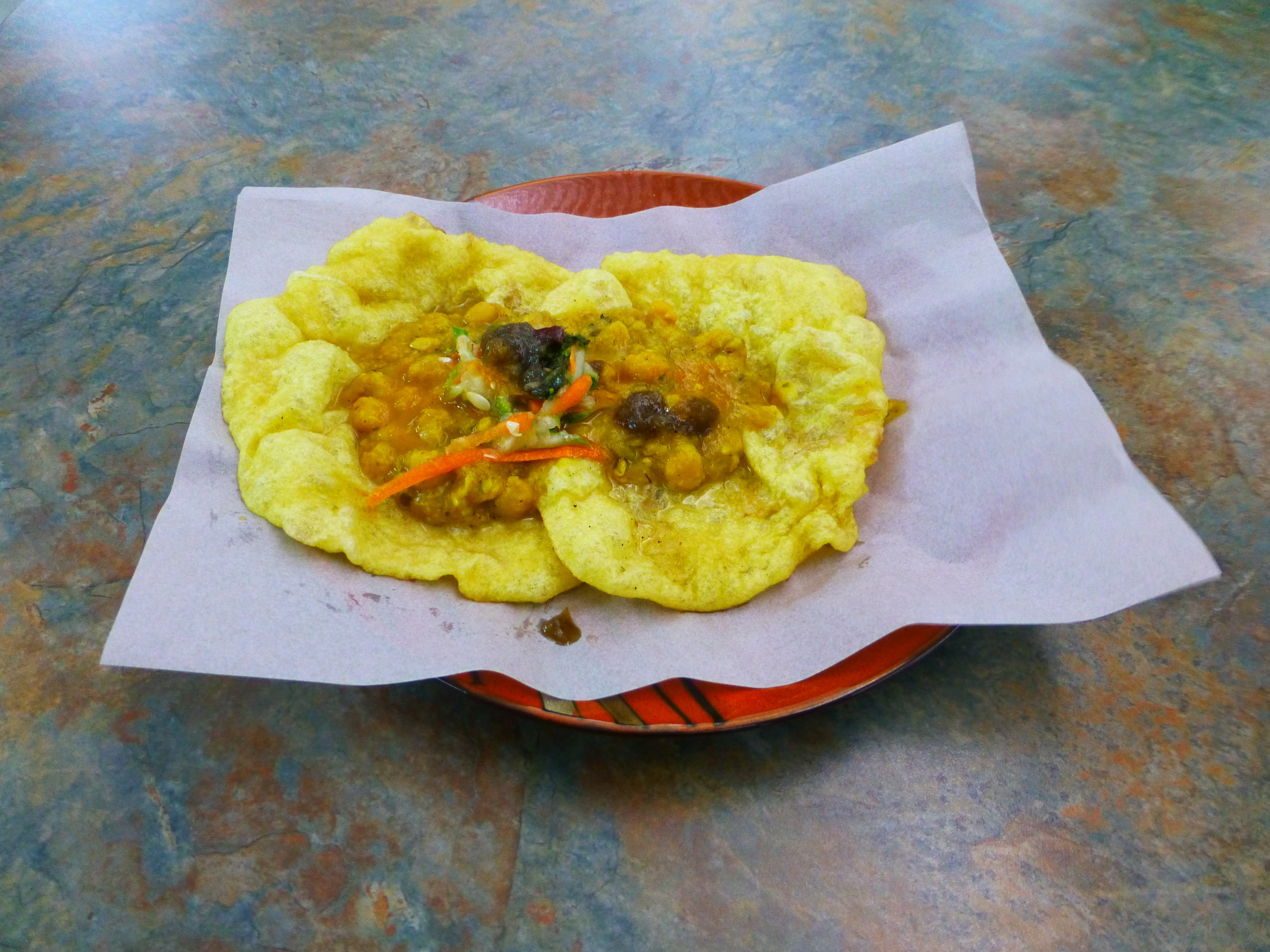
Doubles, a street food in Trinidad and Tobago

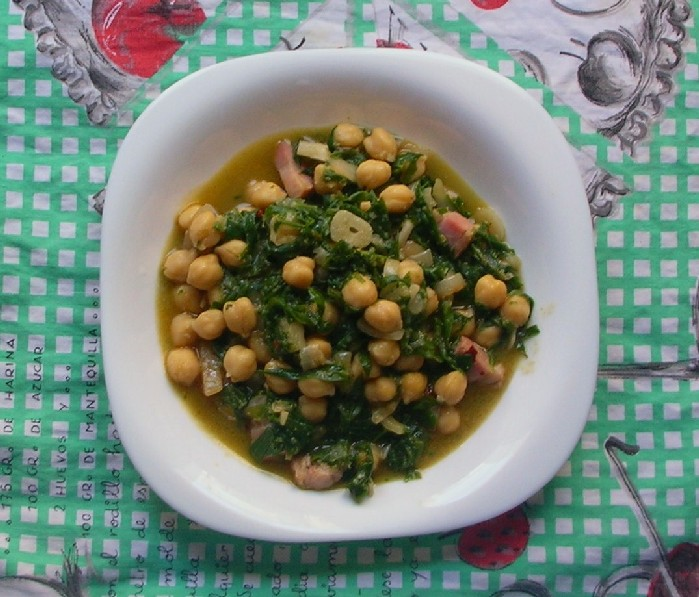
Manchego cuisine; chickpea and Silene vulgaris stew (potaje de garbanzos y collejas)

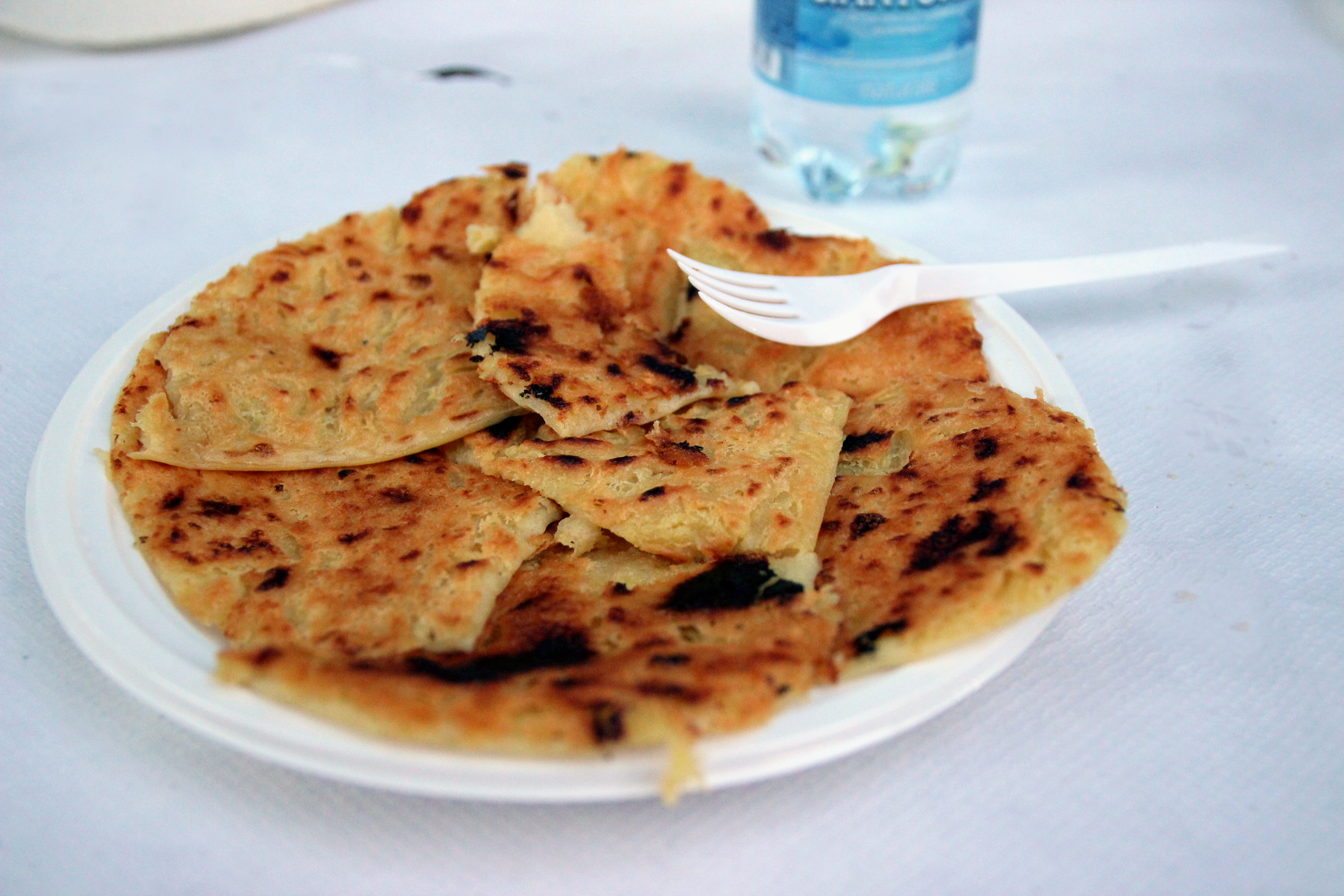
Farinata di ceci, a traditional Italian chickpea snack food

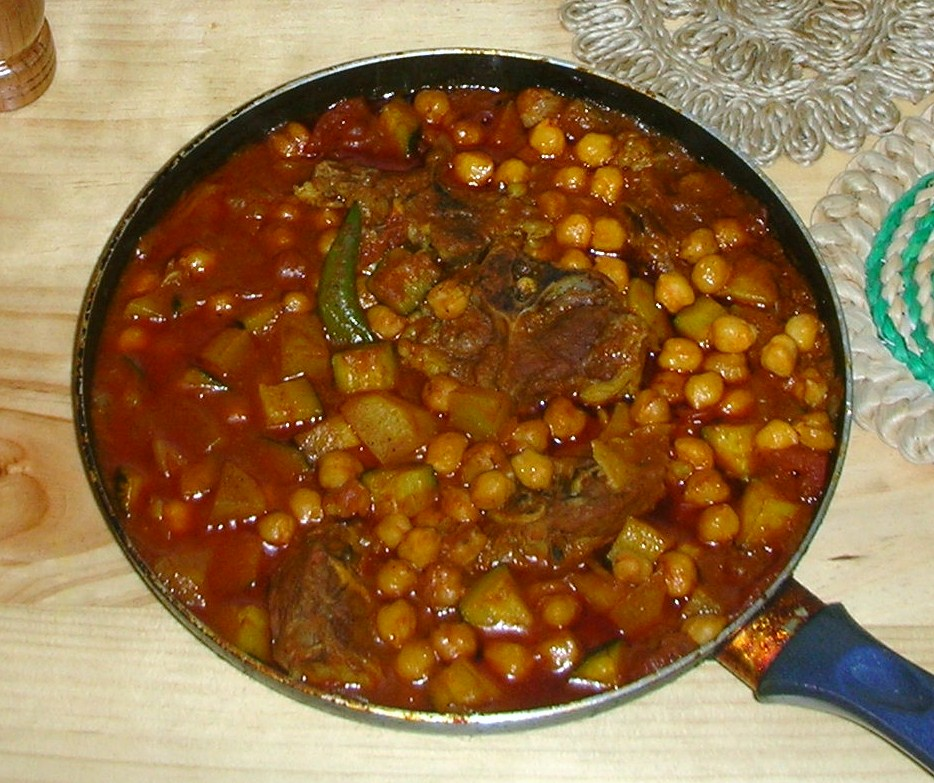
Chakhchoukha in Algerian cuisine; freshly cooked marqa before mixing with rougag

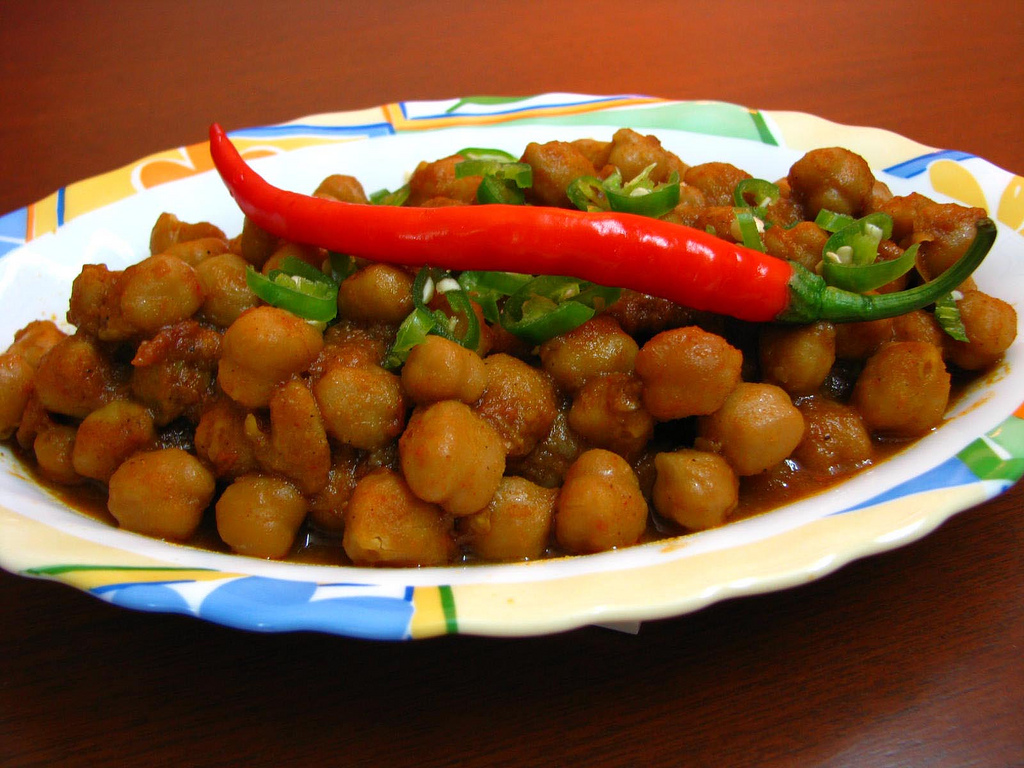
Chana masala, India

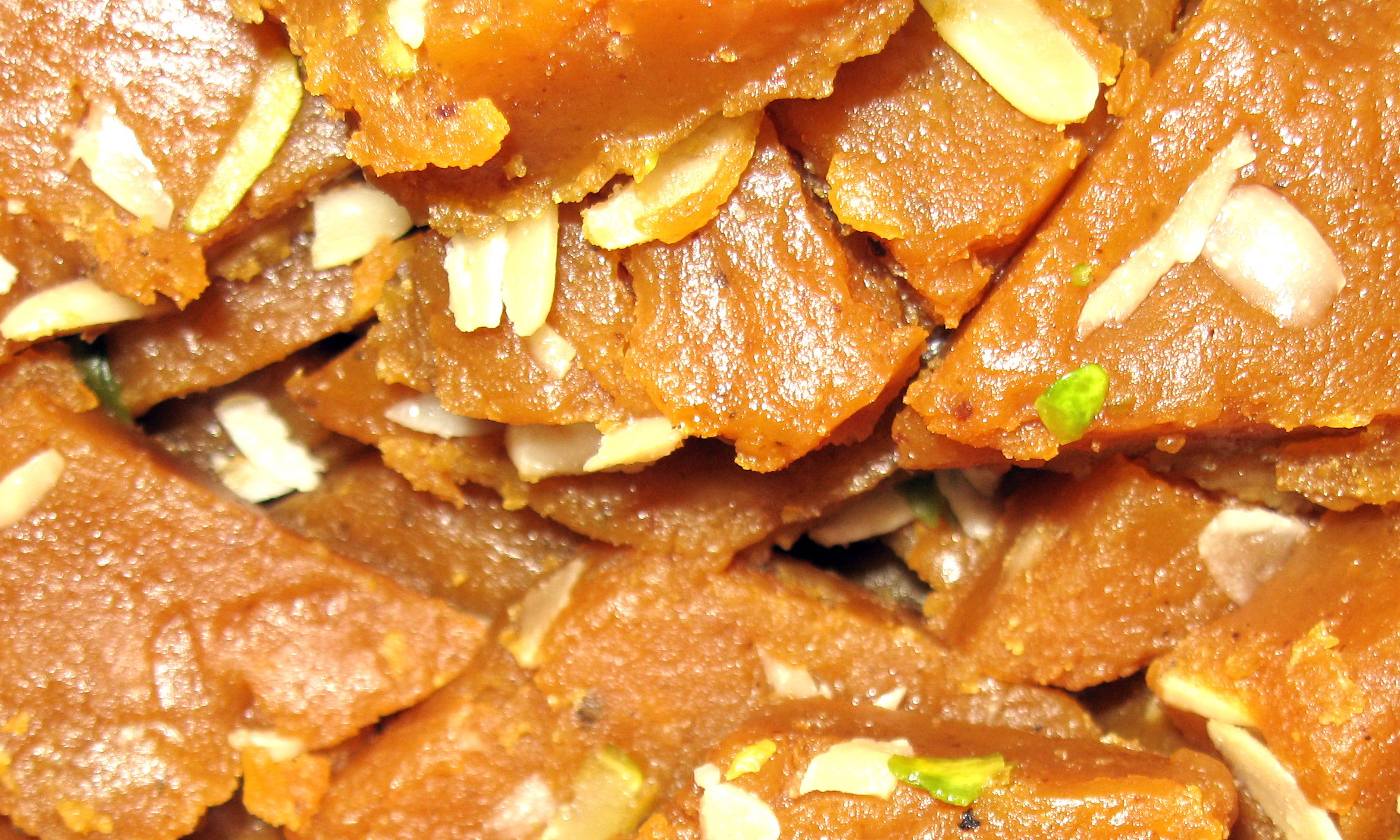
Halua chickpeas, Bangladesh

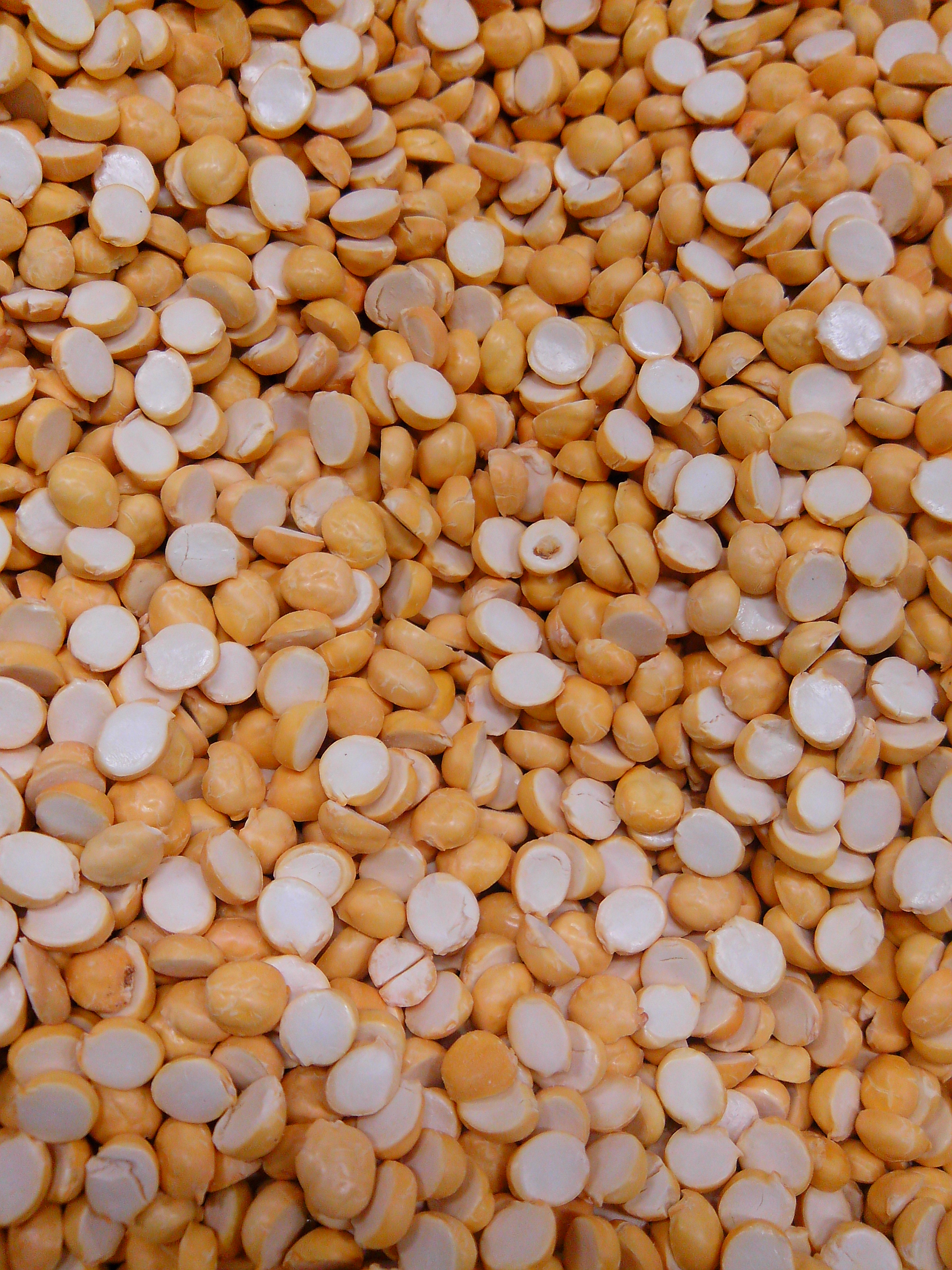
Fried chickpea

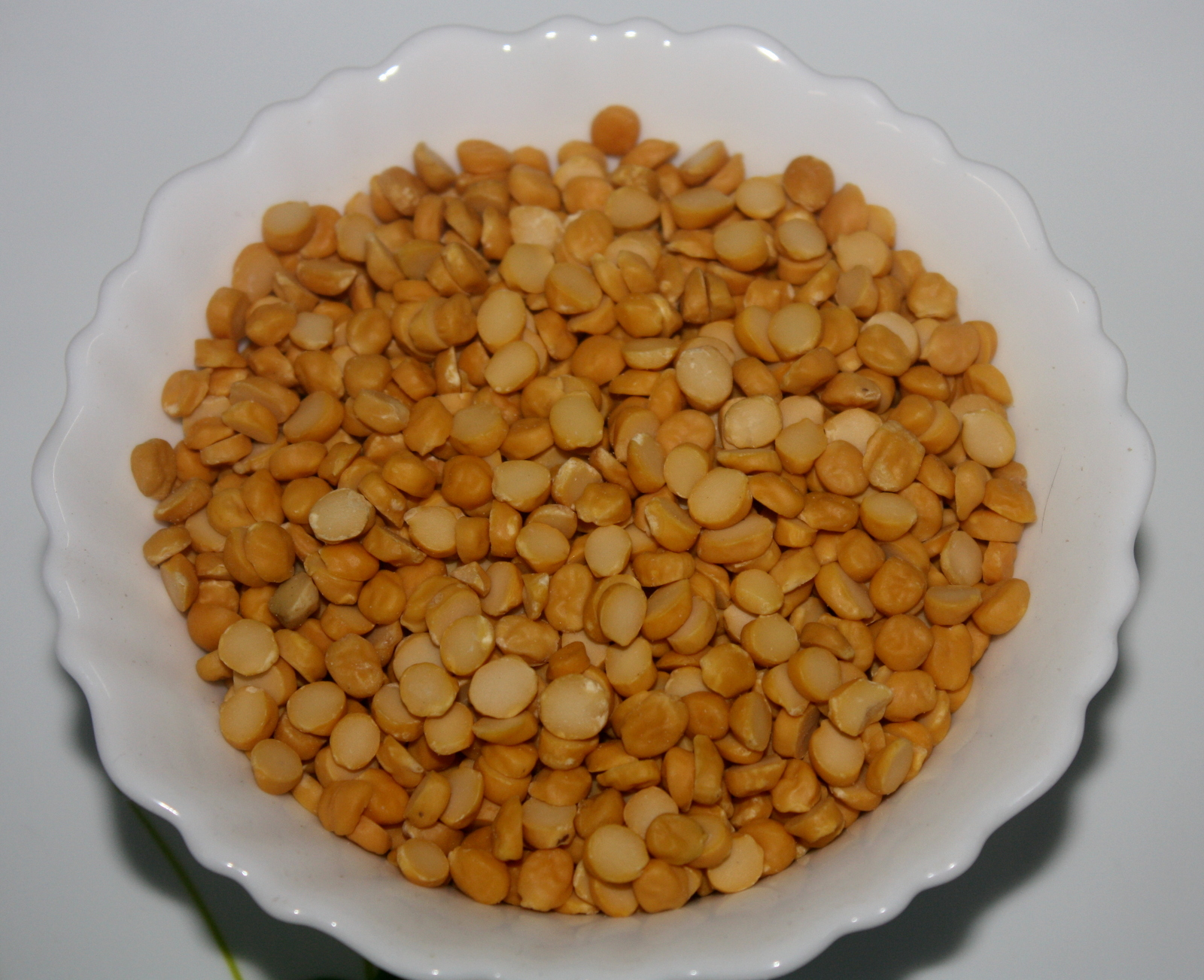
Chana dal, split Bengal gram

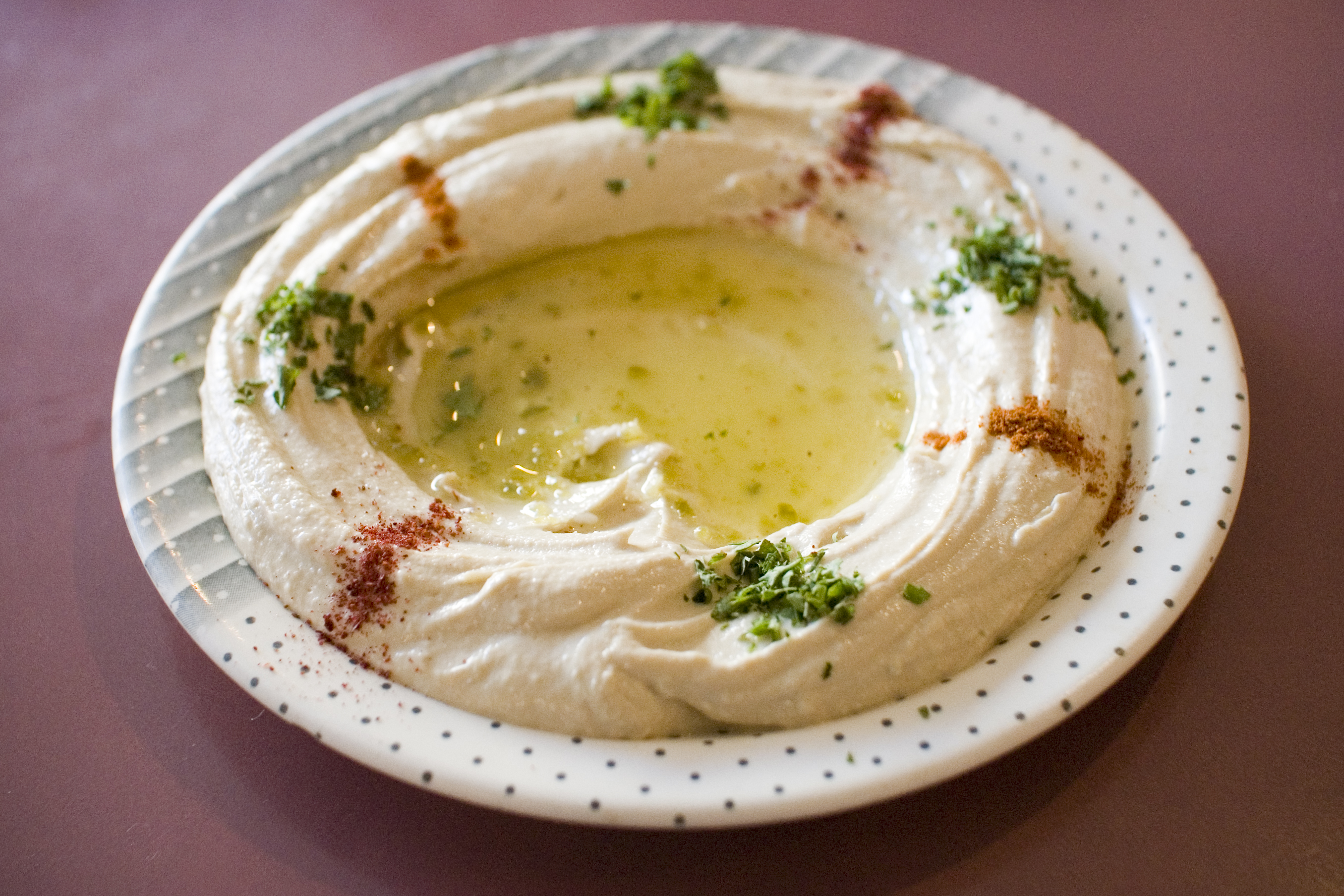
Hummus with olive oil

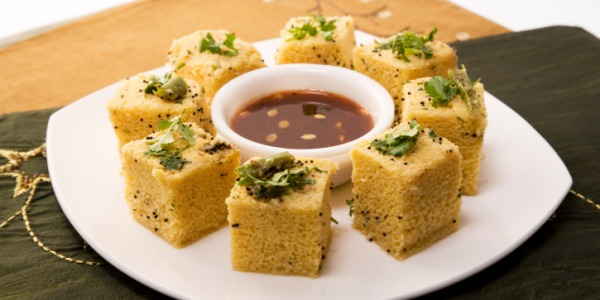
Dhokla, steamed chickpea flour snack

=== Nutrition ===
Chickpeas, mature seeds, cooked, no salt
Nutritional value per 100 g (3.5 oz)
- Energy: 690 kJ (160 kcal)
- Carbohydrates: 27.42 g
- Sugars: 4.8 g
- Dietary fibre: 7.6 g
- Fat: 2.59 g
- Saturated: 0.27 g
- Monounsaturated: 0.58 g
- Polyunsaturated: 1.16 g
- Protein: 8.86 g
Vitamins and minerals
Vitamins	Quantity %DV^{†}
Vitamin A equiv.	0% 1 μg
Thiamine (B1)	10% 0.12 mg
Riboflavin (B2)	5% 0.06 mg
Niacin (B3)	3% 0.53 mg
Pantothenic acid (B5)	6% 0.29 mg
Vitamin B6	8% 0.14 mg
Folate (B9)	43% 172 μg
Vitamin C	1% 1.3 mg
Vitamin E	2% 0.35 mg
Vitamin K	3% 4 μg
Minerals	Quantity %DV^{†}
Calcium	4% 49 mg
Iron	16% 2.89 mg
Magnesium	11% 48 mg
Manganese	45% 1.03 mg
Phosphorus	13% 168 mg
Potassium	10% 291 mg
Sodium	0% 7 mg
Zinc	14% 1.53 mg
- Other constituents: Quantity
- Water: 60.21 g
- Link to USDA Database entry
- ^{†}Percentages estimated using US recommendations for adults, except for potassium, which is estimated based on expert recommendation from the National Academies.

Cooked chickpeas are 60% water, 27% carbohydrates, 9% protein, and 3% fat (table). In a reference amount of 100 grams (3 1/2 ounces), cooked chickpeas supply 690 kilojoules (160 kilocalories) of food energy, and are a rich source (20% or more of the Daily Value, DV) of folate (43% DV) and manganese (45% DV, table). Cooked chickpeas are a moderate source (10–16% DV) of thiamine and several dietary minerals (table).

The consumption of chickpeas is under preliminary research for the potential to improve nutrition and affect chronic diseases.

=== Cooking effects ===
Cooking treatments do not lead to variance in total protein and carbohydrate content. Cooking increases protein digestibility, essential amino acid index, and protein efficiency ratio. Raffinose and sucrose and other reducing sugars diffuse from the chickpea into the cooking water and this reduces or completely removes these components from the chickpea. Cooking significantly reduces fat and mineral content. The B vitamins riboflavin, thiamin, niacin, and pyridoxine dissolve into cooking water at differing rates.

Like most pulses, chickpeas contain oligosaccharides (raffinose, stachyose, and verbascose) which are indigestible to humans but are fermented in the gut by bacteria, leading to flatulence in susceptible individuals. This can be prevented by skinning the husks from the chickpeas before serving.

In some parts of the world, young chickpea leaves are consumed as cooked green vegetables to supplement dietary nutrients.

=== Animal feed ===
Chickpeas are an energy and protein source as animal feed.

Raw chickpeas have a lower trypsin and chymotrypsin inhibitor content than peas, common beans, and soybeans. This leads to higher nutrition values and fewer digestive problems in non-ruminants. Non-ruminant diets can be completed with 200 g/kg of raw chickpeas to promote egg production and growth of birds and pigs. Higher amounts can be used when chickpeas are treated with heat.

Secondary components of legumes—such as lecithin, polyphenols, oligosaccharides; and amylase, protease, trypsin and chymotrypsin inhibitors—can lead to lower nutrient availability, and thus to impaired growth and health of animals (especially in nonruminants).

== Gallery ==
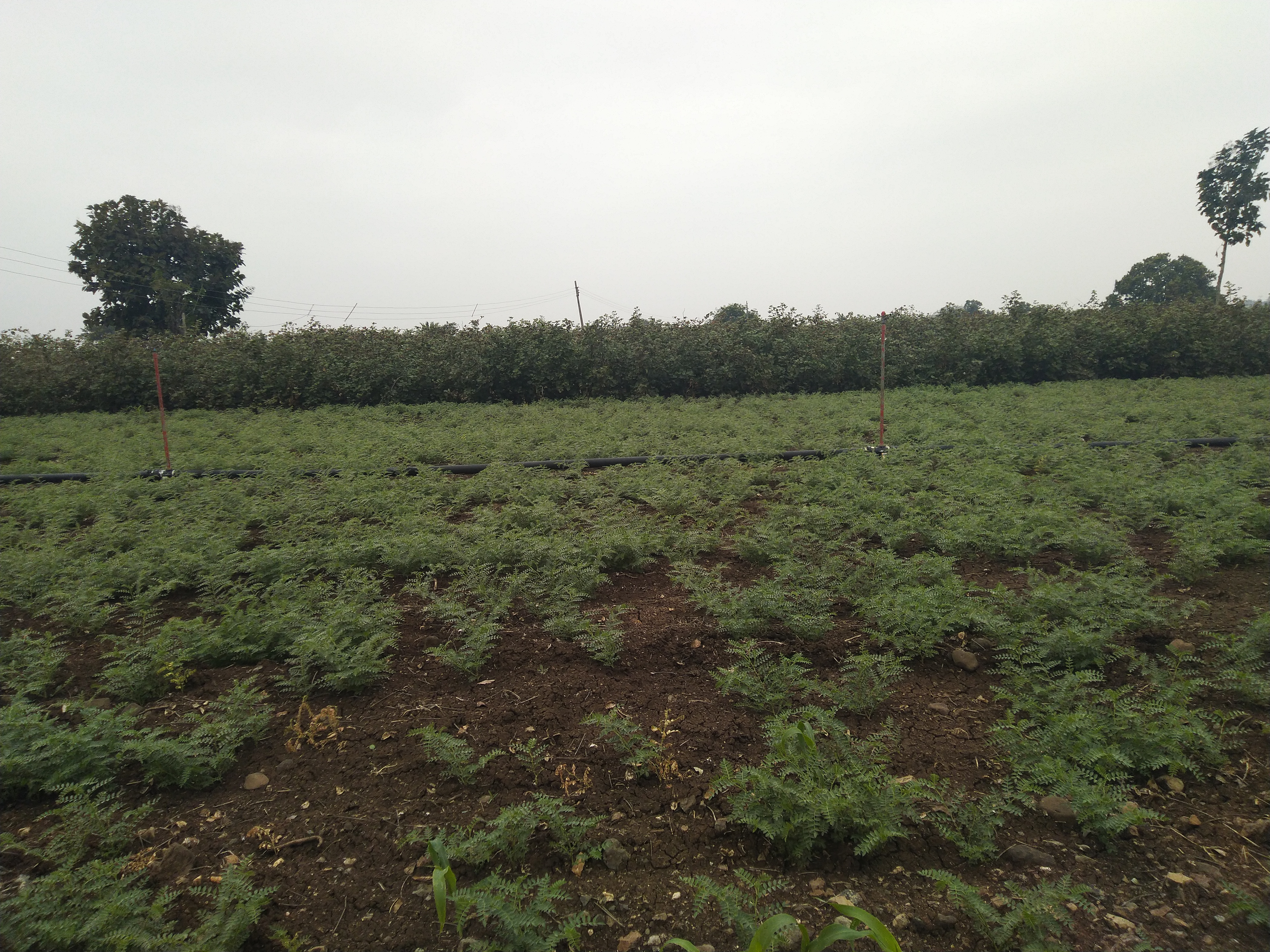
Cicers farm

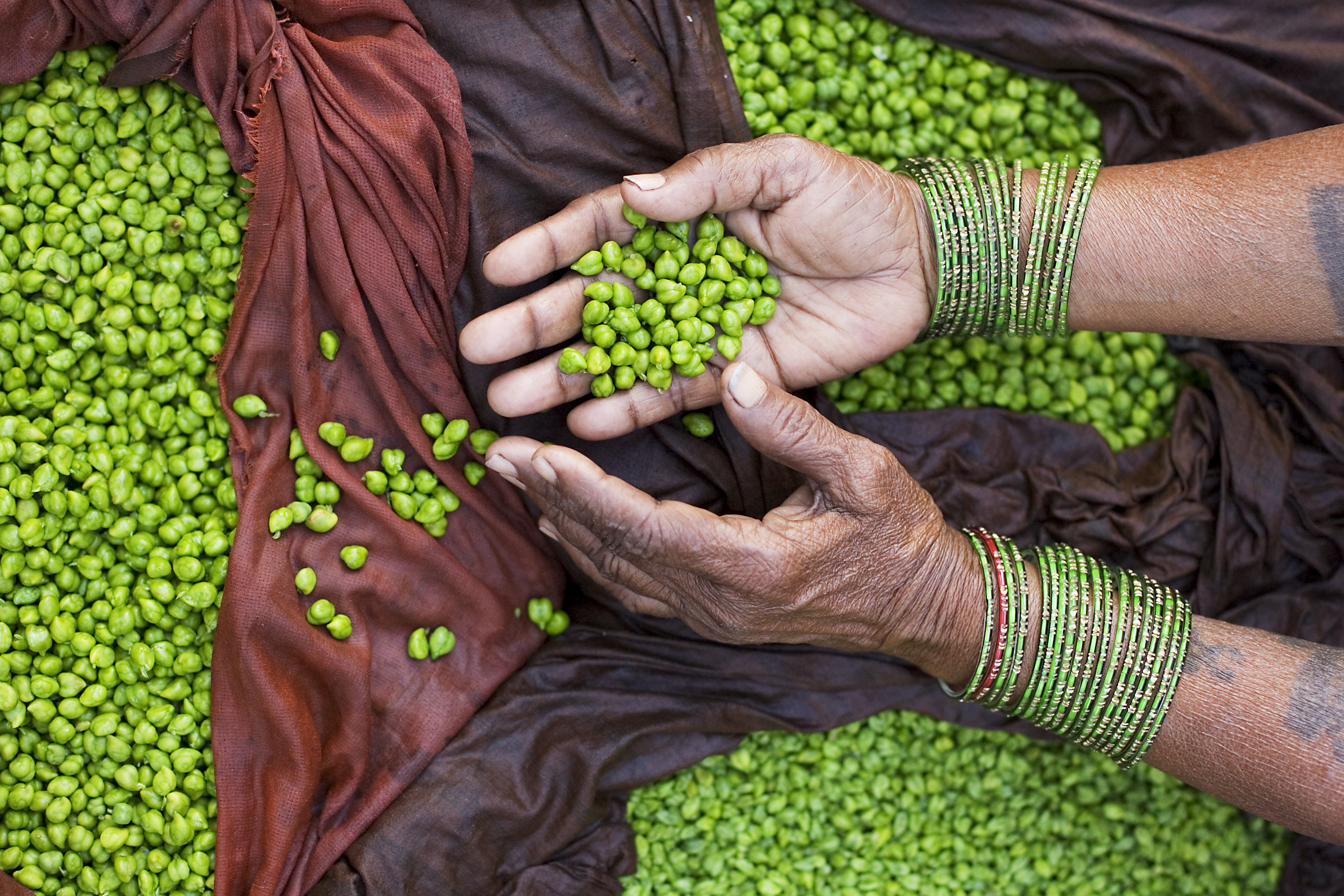
Lime green chickpeas

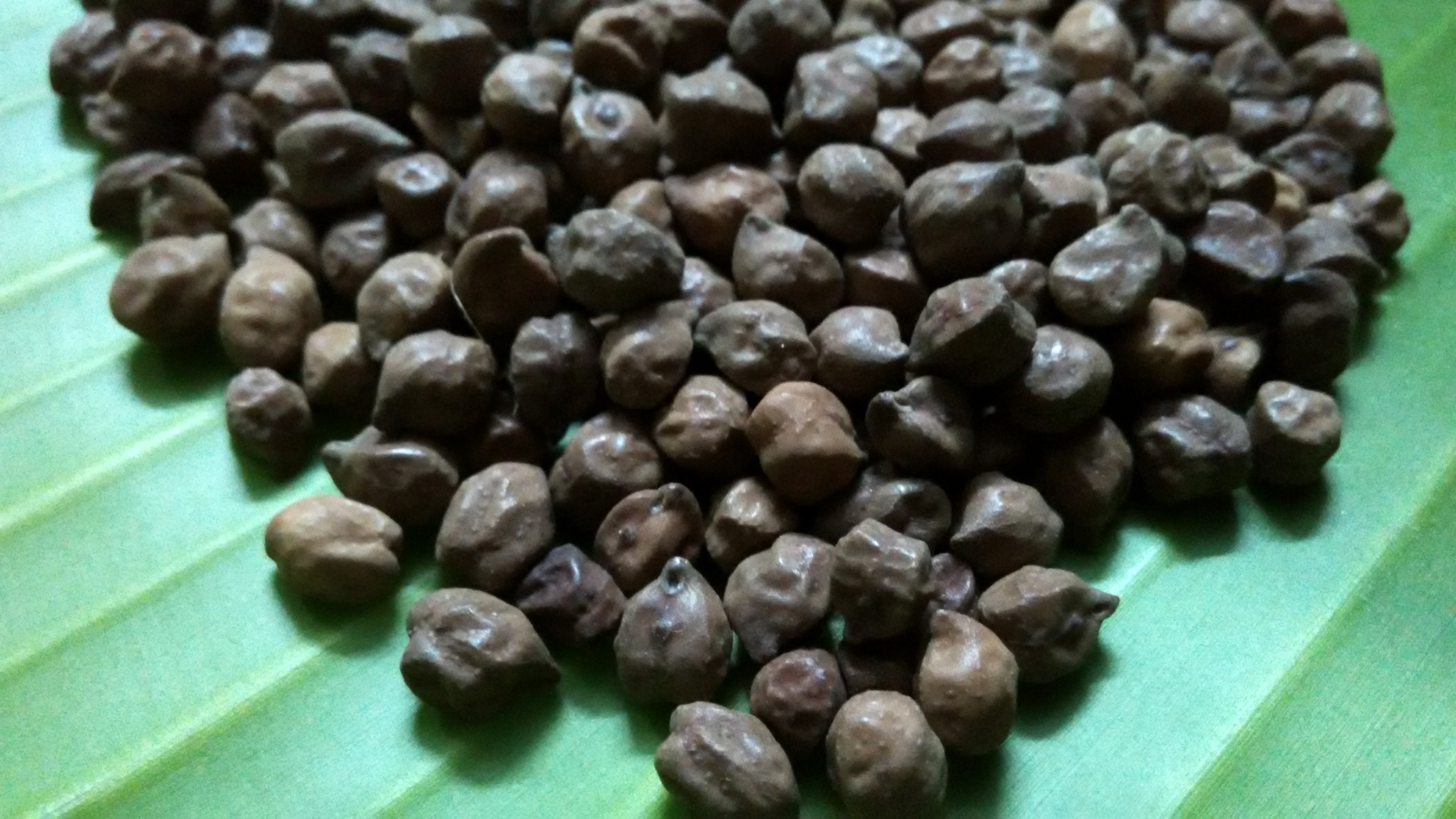
Black chickpeas

== See also ==
- Chickpeas in Nepal
