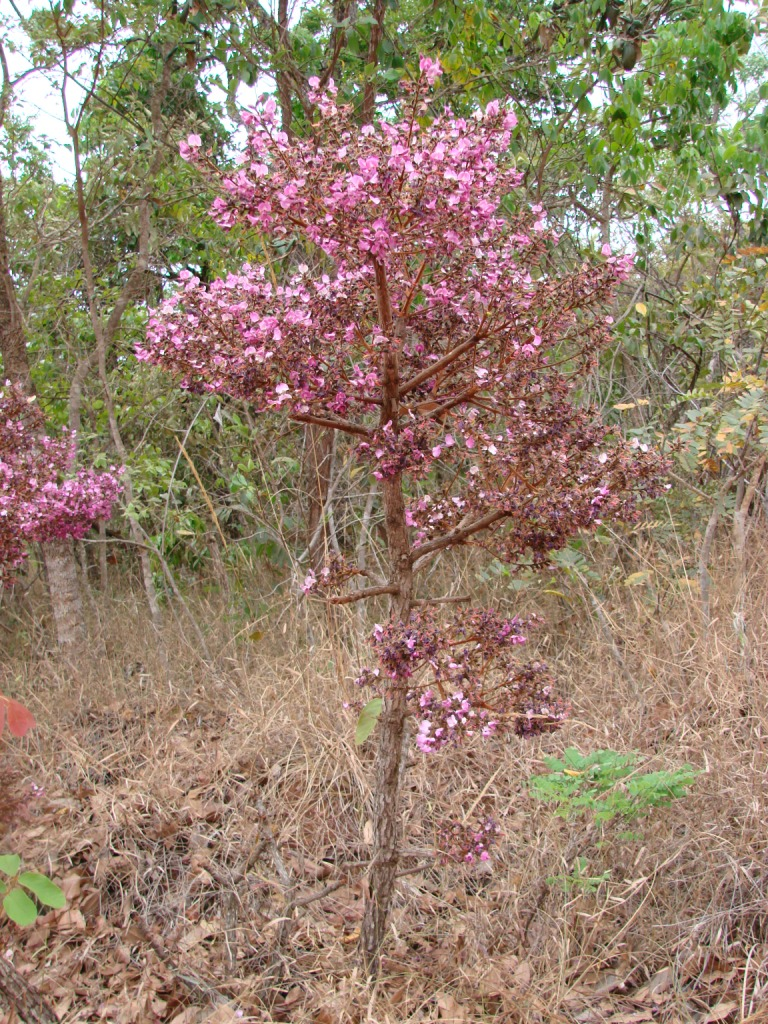

Scientific classification
- Kingdom: Plantae
- Clade: Tracheophytes
- Clade: Angiosperms
- Clade: Eudicots
- Clade: Rosids
- Order: Fabales
- Family: Fabaceae
- Subfamily: Faboideae
- Genus: Andira
- Species: A. humilis

Binomial name
- Andira humilis Mart. ex Benth.

Synonyms
- List: Vouacapoua humilis (Mart. ex Benth.) Kuntze; Andira humilis var. cordata Mattos; Andira laurifolia Benth.; Andira laurifolia var. cordata (Mattos) Mattos; Andira pauciflora Benth.; Andira retusa var. laurifolia (Benth.) Chodat & Hassl.; Vouacapoua laurifolia (Benth.) Kuntze

= Andira humilis =

Species of legume

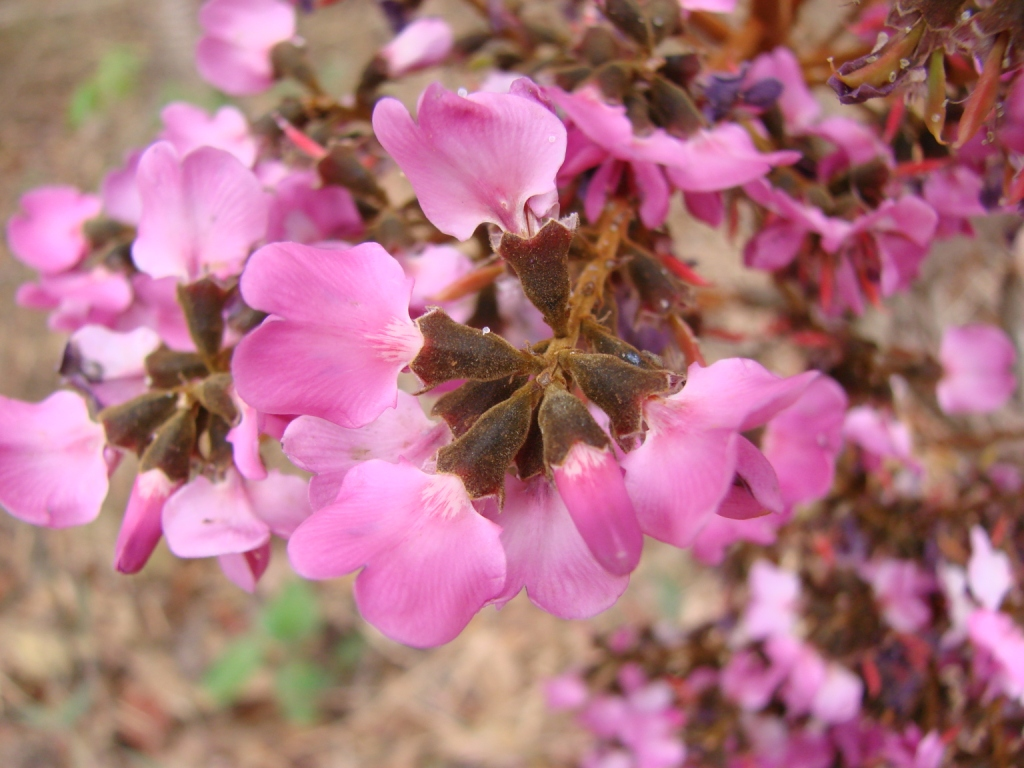
Pink flowers of Andira humilis

Andira humilis is a species of tree native to Brazil.
