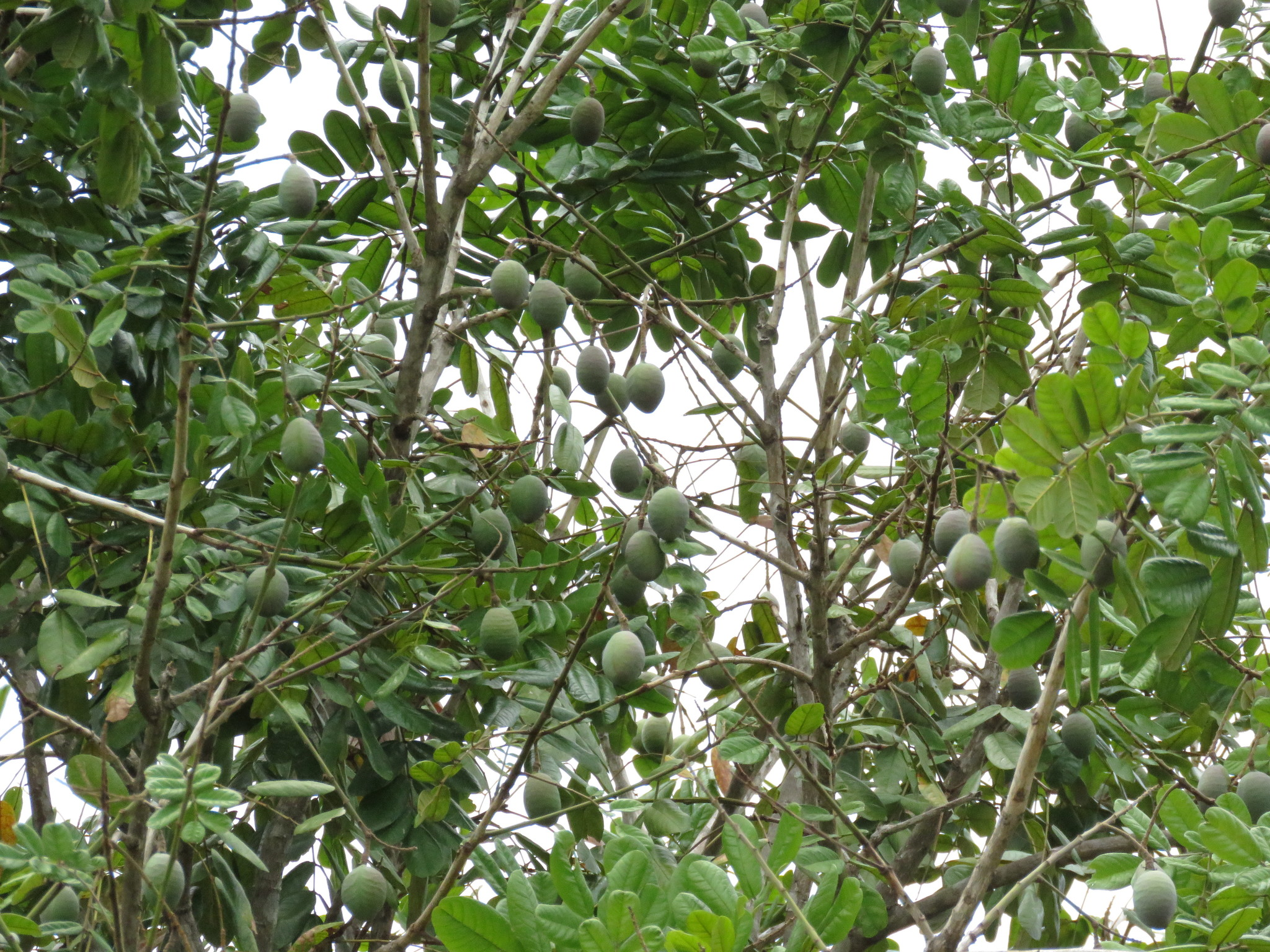

Conservation status
- Vulnerable (IUCN 2.3)

Scientific classification
- Kingdom: Plantae
- Clade: Tracheophytes
- Clade: Angiosperms
- Clade: Eudicots
- Clade: Rosids
- Order: Fabales
- Family: Fabaceae
- Subfamily: Faboideae
- Genus: Andira
- Species: A. galeottiana

Binomial name
- Andira galeottiana Standley

= Andira galeottiana =

Species of legume

Andira galeottiana is a species of legume in the family Fabaceae. It is found only in the Mexican states of Chiapas, Oaxaca, and Veracruz.
