= Cicer echinospermum =

Conservation status
- Least Concern (IUCN 3.1)

Scientific classification
- Kingdom: Plantae
- Clade: Tracheophytes
- Clade: Angiosperms
- Clade: Eudicots
- Clade: Rosids
- Order: Fabales
- Family: Fabaceae
- Subfamily: Faboideae
- Genus: Cicer
- Species: C. echinospermum

Binomial name
- Cicer echinospermum P.H.Davis

Species of plant

Cicer echinospermum is a species of flowering plant in the family Fabaceae. It is native to eastern Turkey and northern Iraq. A prostrate or procumbent annual, it is found in a variety of habitats including forests, grasslands, slopes, rocky areas, and anthropogenically disturbed areas at elevations from 700 to 1,100 m (2,300 to 3,600 ft). It has been assessed as Least Concern. Genetic and morphological evidence places it as a crop wild relative and sole member of the secondary gene pool of chickpea, Cicer arietinum.
