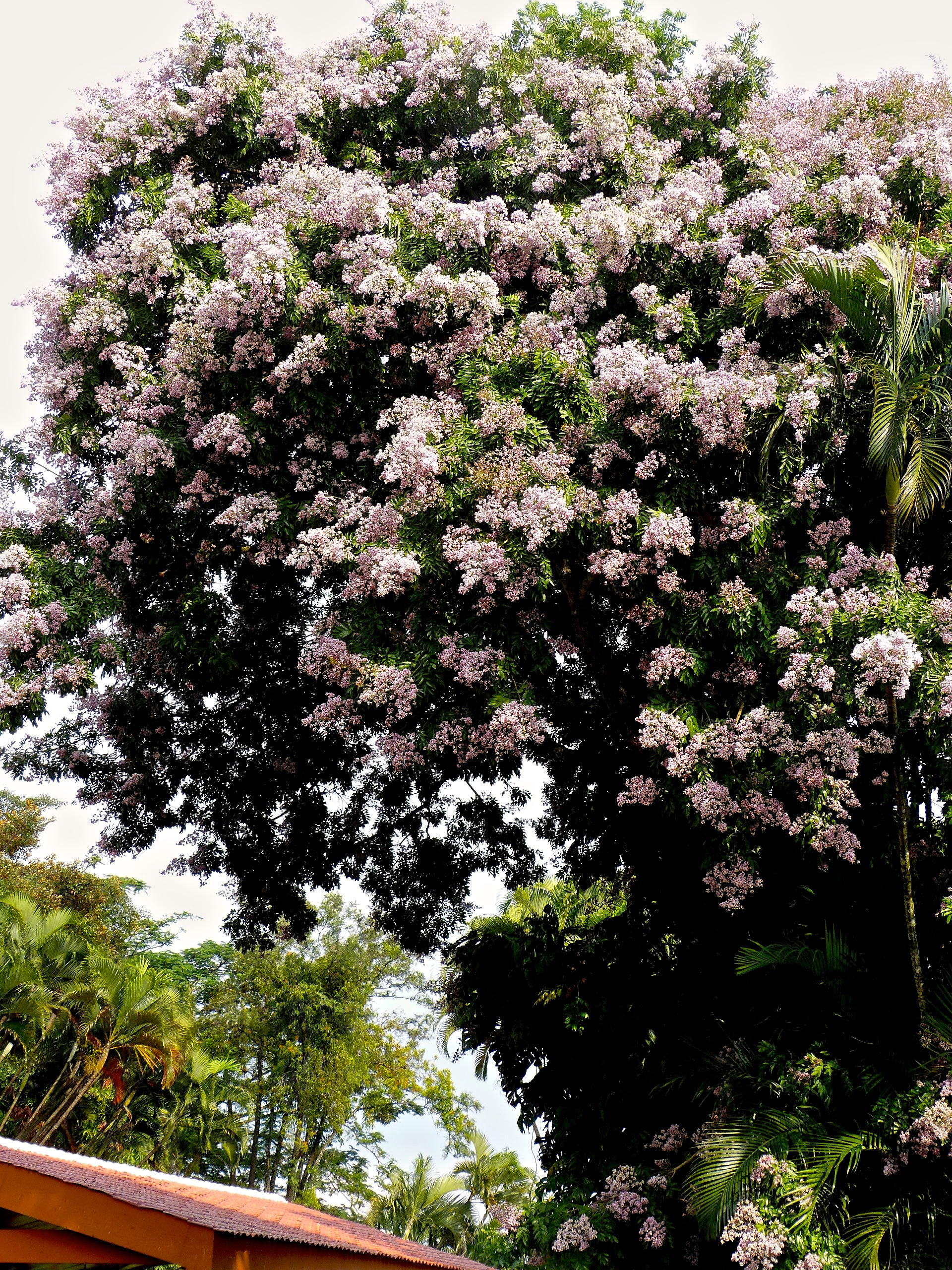

Conservation status
- Least Concern (IUCN 3.1)

Scientific classification
- Kingdom: Plantae
- Clade: Tracheophytes
- Clade: Angiosperms
- Clade: Eudicots
- Clade: Rosids
- Order: Fabales
- Family: Fabaceae
- Subfamily: Faboideae
- Genus: Andira
- Species: A. inermis

Binomial name
- Andira inermis (W.Wright) DC.

Synonyms
- Andira grandiflora Guillemin & Perrottet; Andira jamaicensis (Wright) Urban; Geoffroea inermis (Wright) Wright; Geoffroea jamaicensis Wright var. inermis Wright

= Andira inermis =

Cabbage tree

Species of tree

Andira inermis is a nitrogen-fixing tree with medicinal properties native to the area from southern Mexico through Central America to northern South America (Peru, Bolivia, and Brazil); it has been introduced to the Caribbean, the Antilles, Florida, and Africa and is often pollinated by bees. The tree has many names due to its wide distribution and multiple uses: it is also known as the almendro macho (in El Salvador), almendro de río or river almond (Honduras), bastard cabbage tree, cabbage angelin (United States), cabbage bark (in Belize and the United States), cabbage tree, carne asada (Costa Rica), guacamayo (Honduras), Jamaica cabbage tree, harino (Panama), moca (Puerto Rico), partridge wood (United States), worm bark, or yellow cabbage tree.

The tree grows to approximately 35 metres in height and 0.7 metre in diameter. It is evergreen and unbuttressed and has a dense crown and pink flowers. It grows primarily in riparian zones in forests along rivers. It can also be found in drier areas, including roadsides, pastures, and woodlands.

Known for its unpleasant cabbage-like smell, the leaves of Andira inermis are large and green when mature and tan in color when developing.

The tree's wood is used for lumber, and its smooth gray bark reportedly has narcotic, laxative, and vermifuge properties.

== Medicinal Applications ==
Andira inermis has many connections to traditional medicine in Nigeria, where it has been historically used to alleviate sickness and treat diabetes. A study conducted on rats measuring toxicity and glucose levels confirmed that Andira inermis is a viable treatment for diabetes. Rats treated with Andira inermis had decreased blood glucose. Andira inermis is often used by TMPs to get rid of intestinal worms.

== Pollination ==
Andira inermis is pollinated by many different species of bee. One study found that 70 species of bee visited the flowers of Andira inermis. Of these 70 species, it is likely that only a few of them were true pollinators. These flower sites, which were on trees in Costa Rica, received an average of 800 individual bees per flower site.
