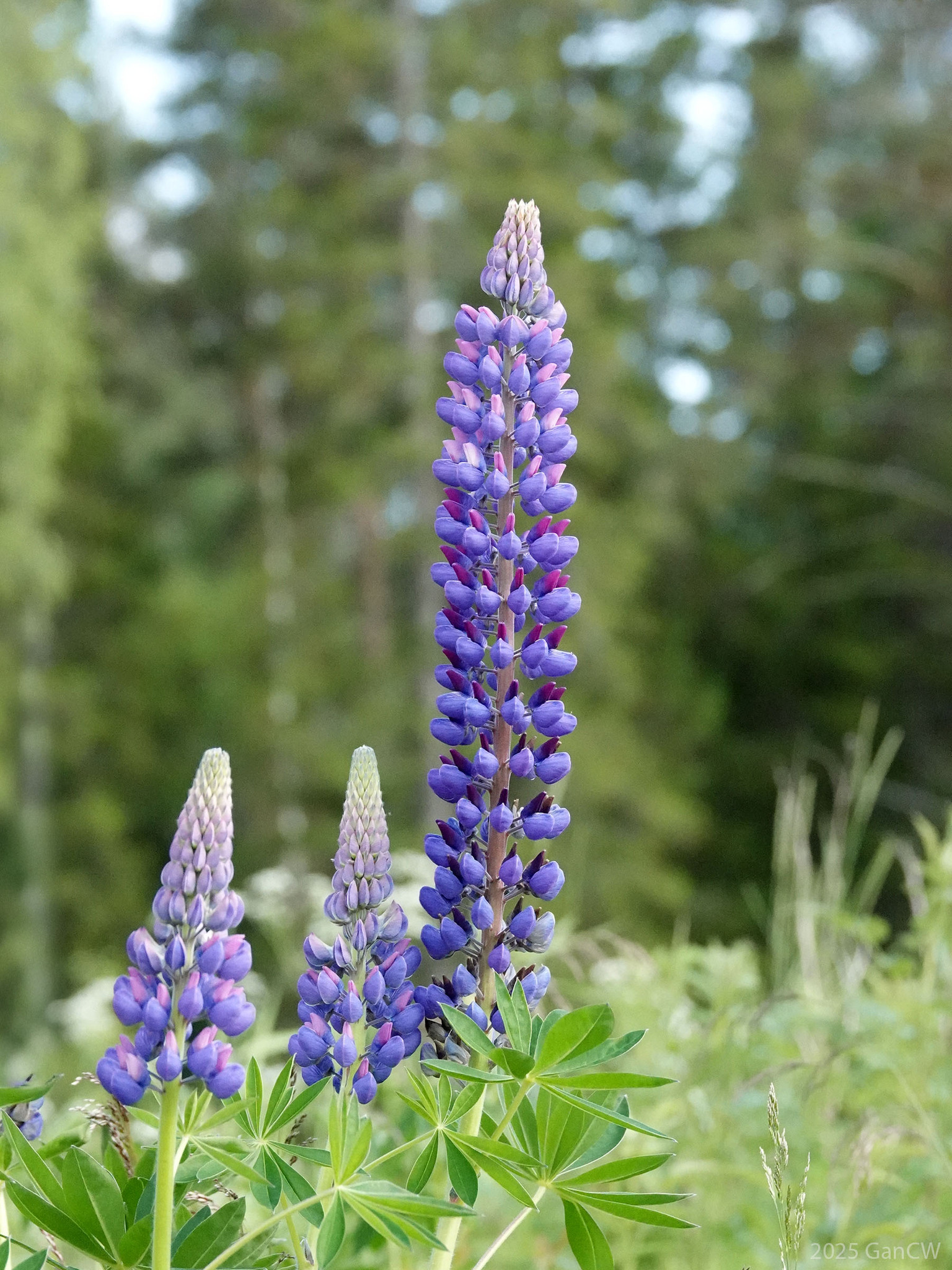
- Lupinus polyphyllus

Scientific classification
- Kingdom: Plantae
- Clade: Tracheophytes
- Clade: Angiosperms
- Clade: Eudicots
- Clade: Rosids
- Order: Fabales
- Family: Fabaceae
- Subfamily: Faboideae
- Clade: Meso-Papilionoideae; L. P. de Queiroz and M. F. Wojciechowski 2013

Clades
- Exostyleae; Genistoids; Vataireoids; Andira clade; Dalbergioids; Old World clade; Baphieae; NPAAA clade; incertae sedis; Amphimas Pierre ex Harms; Dermatophyllum Scheele

Synonyms
- 50-kb Inversion clade Doyle et al. 1997

= Meso-Papilionoideae =

Meso-Papilionoideae Temporal range: Late Paleocene - recent

Clade of legumes

Meso-Papilionoideae or 50-kb Inversion clade is a monophyletic clade of the flowering plant subfamily Faboideae (or Papilionoideae) that includes the majority of papilionoid legumes. It contains many agronomically important genera, including Arachis (peanut), Cicer (chickpea), Glycine (soybean), Medicago (alfalfa), Phaseolus (common bean), Trifolium (clover), Vicia (vetch), and Vigna (mung bean).

This clade is circumscribed by the presence of a 50 kb inverted DNA sequence in the plastome of member species and is consistently resolved in molecular phylogenies.

The name Meso-Papilionoideae was proposed for this clade by Wojciechowski (2013). Its original name, 50-kb Inversion clade is still in use and the clade is still frequently referred to by this name in publications, as well as the Angiosperm Phylogeny Website and NCBI taxonomy browser.

== Description ==
This clade circumscribes six subordinate clades: one traditional tribe (Exostyleae) and five informal clades (the genistoids, the vataireoids, the dalbergioids, the Andira clade, and the Old World Clade), as well as the genus Amphimas. The clade has the following ICPN-compliant, node-based definition:

The most inclusive crown clade exhibiting the structural rearrangement in the plastid genome (inversion of a ~50 Kb segment in the large-single copy region with endpoints between the accD and trnK regions) homologous with that found in Aldina latifolia Spruce ex Benth. 1870, Holocalyx balansae Micheli 1883, Maackia amurensis Rupr. 1856, Wisteria floribunda (Willd.) DC. 1825, and Glycine max (L.) Merr. 1917, where these taxa are extant species included in the crown clade defined by this name.
